

139001–139100 

|-bgcolor=#fefefe
| 139001 ||  || — || February 17, 2001 || Socorro || LINEAR || — || align=right | 1.3 km || 
|-id=002 bgcolor=#fefefe
| 139002 ||  || — || February 17, 2001 || Socorro || LINEAR || NYS || align=right | 1.3 km || 
|-id=003 bgcolor=#fefefe
| 139003 ||  || — || February 17, 2001 || Socorro || LINEAR || — || align=right | 2.0 km || 
|-id=004 bgcolor=#fefefe
| 139004 ||  || — || February 19, 2001 || Socorro || LINEAR || V || align=right | 1.1 km || 
|-id=005 bgcolor=#fefefe
| 139005 ||  || — || February 19, 2001 || Socorro || LINEAR || V || align=right | 1.1 km || 
|-id=006 bgcolor=#fefefe
| 139006 ||  || — || February 19, 2001 || Socorro || LINEAR || FLO || align=right | 1.0 km || 
|-id=007 bgcolor=#fefefe
| 139007 ||  || — || February 19, 2001 || Socorro || LINEAR || — || align=right | 1.5 km || 
|-id=008 bgcolor=#fefefe
| 139008 ||  || — || February 19, 2001 || Socorro || LINEAR || — || align=right | 1.7 km || 
|-id=009 bgcolor=#C2FFFF
| 139009 ||  || — || February 19, 2001 || Socorro || LINEAR || L4 || align=right | 14 km || 
|-id=010 bgcolor=#fefefe
| 139010 ||  || — || February 19, 2001 || Socorro || LINEAR || — || align=right | 1.5 km || 
|-id=011 bgcolor=#fefefe
| 139011 ||  || — || February 19, 2001 || Socorro || LINEAR || — || align=right | 1.6 km || 
|-id=012 bgcolor=#fefefe
| 139012 ||  || — || February 19, 2001 || Socorro || LINEAR || — || align=right | 2.1 km || 
|-id=013 bgcolor=#fefefe
| 139013 ||  || — || February 19, 2001 || Socorro || LINEAR || NYS || align=right | 1.2 km || 
|-id=014 bgcolor=#fefefe
| 139014 ||  || — || February 19, 2001 || Socorro || LINEAR || — || align=right | 1.4 km || 
|-id=015 bgcolor=#fefefe
| 139015 ||  || — || February 17, 2001 || Kitt Peak || Spacewatch || NYS || align=right | 1.1 km || 
|-id=016 bgcolor=#fefefe
| 139016 ||  || — || February 19, 2001 || Socorro || LINEAR || FLO || align=right | 1.5 km || 
|-id=017 bgcolor=#fefefe
| 139017 ||  || — || February 17, 2001 || Socorro || LINEAR || V || align=right | 1.5 km || 
|-id=018 bgcolor=#fefefe
| 139018 ||  || — || February 19, 2001 || Socorro || LINEAR || — || align=right | 1.7 km || 
|-id=019 bgcolor=#fefefe
| 139019 ||  || — || February 19, 2001 || Socorro || LINEAR || — || align=right | 1.5 km || 
|-id=020 bgcolor=#fefefe
| 139020 ||  || — || February 19, 2001 || Socorro || LINEAR || — || align=right | 1.6 km || 
|-id=021 bgcolor=#E9E9E9
| 139021 ||  || — || February 19, 2001 || Socorro || LINEAR || — || align=right | 2.2 km || 
|-id=022 bgcolor=#fefefe
| 139022 ||  || — || February 19, 2001 || Socorro || LINEAR || V || align=right | 1.5 km || 
|-id=023 bgcolor=#fefefe
| 139023 ||  || — || February 19, 2001 || Socorro || LINEAR || — || align=right | 1.5 km || 
|-id=024 bgcolor=#fefefe
| 139024 ||  || — || February 19, 2001 || Socorro || LINEAR || — || align=right | 1.2 km || 
|-id=025 bgcolor=#fefefe
| 139025 ||  || — || February 19, 2001 || Socorro || LINEAR || FLO || align=right | 1.3 km || 
|-id=026 bgcolor=#fefefe
| 139026 ||  || — || February 20, 2001 || Socorro || LINEAR || — || align=right | 1.6 km || 
|-id=027 bgcolor=#fefefe
| 139027 ||  || — || February 23, 2001 || Kitt Peak || Spacewatch || EUT || align=right | 1.1 km || 
|-id=028 bgcolor=#fefefe
| 139028 Haynald ||  ||  || February 28, 2001 || Piszkéstető || K. Sárneczky, A. Derekas || FLO || align=right | 1.1 km || 
|-id=029 bgcolor=#fefefe
| 139029 ||  || — || February 20, 2001 || Kitt Peak || Spacewatch || NYS || align=right | 2.8 km || 
|-id=030 bgcolor=#fefefe
| 139030 ||  || — || February 17, 2001 || Socorro || LINEAR || — || align=right | 1.0 km || 
|-id=031 bgcolor=#fefefe
| 139031 ||  || — || February 16, 2001 || Socorro || LINEAR || — || align=right | 1.3 km || 
|-id=032 bgcolor=#fefefe
| 139032 ||  || — || February 16, 2001 || Socorro || LINEAR || FLO || align=right | 1.3 km || 
|-id=033 bgcolor=#fefefe
| 139033 ||  || — || February 16, 2001 || Haleakala || NEAT || FLO || align=right | 1.00 km || 
|-id=034 bgcolor=#E9E9E9
| 139034 ||  || — || February 16, 2001 || Anderson Mesa || LONEOS || MAR || align=right | 2.3 km || 
|-id=035 bgcolor=#d6d6d6
| 139035 ||  || — || February 16, 2001 || Anderson Mesa || LONEOS || VER || align=right | 5.5 km || 
|-id=036 bgcolor=#fefefe
| 139036 ||  || — || February 16, 2001 || Anderson Mesa || LONEOS || FLO || align=right | 1.5 km || 
|-id=037 bgcolor=#fefefe
| 139037 ||  || — || February 16, 2001 || Anderson Mesa || LONEOS || — || align=right | 1.3 km || 
|-id=038 bgcolor=#fefefe
| 139038 ||  || — || March 1, 2001 || Socorro || LINEAR || — || align=right | 1.7 km || 
|-id=039 bgcolor=#fefefe
| 139039 ||  || — || March 2, 2001 || Anderson Mesa || LONEOS || — || align=right | 1.5 km || 
|-id=040 bgcolor=#fefefe
| 139040 ||  || — || March 2, 2001 || Anderson Mesa || LONEOS || NYS || align=right | 1.1 km || 
|-id=041 bgcolor=#fefefe
| 139041 ||  || — || March 2, 2001 || Anderson Mesa || LONEOS || — || align=right | 1.6 km || 
|-id=042 bgcolor=#fefefe
| 139042 ||  || — || March 2, 2001 || Anderson Mesa || LONEOS || — || align=right | 1.7 km || 
|-id=043 bgcolor=#fefefe
| 139043 ||  || — || March 2, 2001 || Anderson Mesa || LONEOS || — || align=right | 1.4 km || 
|-id=044 bgcolor=#fefefe
| 139044 ||  || — || March 2, 2001 || Anderson Mesa || LONEOS || FLO || align=right | 1.5 km || 
|-id=045 bgcolor=#fefefe
| 139045 ||  || — || March 2, 2001 || Anderson Mesa || LONEOS || FLO || align=right | 1.6 km || 
|-id=046 bgcolor=#fefefe
| 139046 ||  || — || March 14, 2001 || Socorro || LINEAR || PHO || align=right | 2.7 km || 
|-id=047 bgcolor=#FFC2E0
| 139047 ||  || — || March 14, 2001 || Socorro || LINEAR || AMO +1km || align=right | 1.2 km || 
|-id=048 bgcolor=#fefefe
| 139048 ||  || — || March 15, 2001 || Anderson Mesa || LONEOS || V || align=right | 1.2 km || 
|-id=049 bgcolor=#fefefe
| 139049 ||  || — || March 15, 2001 || Anderson Mesa || LONEOS || — || align=right | 1.6 km || 
|-id=050 bgcolor=#fefefe
| 139050 ||  || — || March 15, 2001 || Anderson Mesa || LONEOS || FLO || align=right | 1.4 km || 
|-id=051 bgcolor=#fefefe
| 139051 ||  || — || March 15, 2001 || Haleakala || NEAT || FLO || align=right | 1.5 km || 
|-id=052 bgcolor=#fefefe
| 139052 ||  || — || March 2, 2001 || Anderson Mesa || LONEOS || — || align=right | 3.5 km || 
|-id=053 bgcolor=#fefefe
| 139053 ||  || — || March 2, 2001 || Anderson Mesa || LONEOS || — || align=right | 1.4 km || 
|-id=054 bgcolor=#fefefe
| 139054 ||  || — || March 2, 2001 || Anderson Mesa || LONEOS || — || align=right | 1.5 km || 
|-id=055 bgcolor=#fefefe
| 139055 || 2001 FT || — || March 16, 2001 || Socorro || LINEAR || — || align=right | 3.2 km || 
|-id=056 bgcolor=#FFC2E0
| 139056 || 2001 FY || — || March 16, 2001 || Socorro || LINEAR || AMO || align=right data-sort-value="0.32" | 320 m || 
|-id=057 bgcolor=#fefefe
| 139057 ||  || — || March 16, 2001 || Kitt Peak || Spacewatch || FLO || align=right | 1.1 km || 
|-id=058 bgcolor=#fefefe
| 139058 ||  || — || March 16, 2001 || Socorro || LINEAR || PHO || align=right | 2.3 km || 
|-id=059 bgcolor=#fefefe
| 139059 ||  || — || March 18, 2001 || Socorro || LINEAR || — || align=right | 1.1 km || 
|-id=060 bgcolor=#fefefe
| 139060 ||  || — || March 18, 2001 || Socorro || LINEAR || NYS || align=right | 1.2 km || 
|-id=061 bgcolor=#fefefe
| 139061 ||  || — || March 18, 2001 || Socorro || LINEAR || FLO || align=right | 1.8 km || 
|-id=062 bgcolor=#fefefe
| 139062 ||  || — || March 19, 2001 || Oizumi || T. Kobayashi || — || align=right | 1.3 km || 
|-id=063 bgcolor=#fefefe
| 139063 ||  || — || March 18, 2001 || Socorro || LINEAR || — || align=right | 1.5 km || 
|-id=064 bgcolor=#fefefe
| 139064 ||  || — || March 18, 2001 || Socorro || LINEAR || — || align=right | 1.5 km || 
|-id=065 bgcolor=#fefefe
| 139065 ||  || — || March 19, 2001 || Kitt Peak || Spacewatch || NYS || align=right data-sort-value="0.80" | 800 m || 
|-id=066 bgcolor=#E9E9E9
| 139066 ||  || — || March 19, 2001 || Socorro || LINEAR || — || align=right | 1.8 km || 
|-id=067 bgcolor=#fefefe
| 139067 ||  || — || March 20, 2001 || Haleakala || NEAT || — || align=right | 1.9 km || 
|-id=068 bgcolor=#fefefe
| 139068 ||  || — || March 19, 2001 || Anderson Mesa || LONEOS || — || align=right | 1.3 km || 
|-id=069 bgcolor=#fefefe
| 139069 ||  || — || March 19, 2001 || Anderson Mesa || LONEOS || — || align=right | 1.5 km || 
|-id=070 bgcolor=#fefefe
| 139070 ||  || — || March 19, 2001 || Anderson Mesa || LONEOS || NYS || align=right | 1.2 km || 
|-id=071 bgcolor=#fefefe
| 139071 ||  || — || March 19, 2001 || Anderson Mesa || LONEOS || — || align=right | 1.4 km || 
|-id=072 bgcolor=#fefefe
| 139072 ||  || — || March 19, 2001 || Anderson Mesa || LONEOS || NYS || align=right | 1.1 km || 
|-id=073 bgcolor=#fefefe
| 139073 ||  || — || March 19, 2001 || Anderson Mesa || LONEOS || — || align=right | 1.4 km || 
|-id=074 bgcolor=#fefefe
| 139074 ||  || — || March 19, 2001 || Anderson Mesa || LONEOS || FLO || align=right | 1.4 km || 
|-id=075 bgcolor=#fefefe
| 139075 ||  || — || March 19, 2001 || Anderson Mesa || LONEOS || — || align=right | 1.6 km || 
|-id=076 bgcolor=#fefefe
| 139076 ||  || — || March 19, 2001 || Anderson Mesa || LONEOS || — || align=right | 1.9 km || 
|-id=077 bgcolor=#fefefe
| 139077 ||  || — || March 19, 2001 || Anderson Mesa || LONEOS || — || align=right | 1.7 km || 
|-id=078 bgcolor=#fefefe
| 139078 ||  || — || March 19, 2001 || Anderson Mesa || LONEOS || — || align=right | 1.7 km || 
|-id=079 bgcolor=#fefefe
| 139079 ||  || — || March 19, 2001 || Anderson Mesa || LONEOS || FLO || align=right | 1.4 km || 
|-id=080 bgcolor=#fefefe
| 139080 ||  || — || March 19, 2001 || Anderson Mesa || LONEOS || NYS || align=right | 1.2 km || 
|-id=081 bgcolor=#fefefe
| 139081 ||  || — || March 19, 2001 || Anderson Mesa || LONEOS || NYS || align=right | 1.2 km || 
|-id=082 bgcolor=#fefefe
| 139082 ||  || — || March 19, 2001 || Anderson Mesa || LONEOS || NYS || align=right | 1.1 km || 
|-id=083 bgcolor=#fefefe
| 139083 ||  || — || March 19, 2001 || Anderson Mesa || LONEOS || NYS || align=right data-sort-value="0.94" | 940 m || 
|-id=084 bgcolor=#fefefe
| 139084 ||  || — || March 21, 2001 || Anderson Mesa || LONEOS || NYS || align=right | 1.3 km || 
|-id=085 bgcolor=#fefefe
| 139085 ||  || — || March 18, 2001 || Socorro || LINEAR || — || align=right | 2.0 km || 
|-id=086 bgcolor=#fefefe
| 139086 ||  || — || March 18, 2001 || Socorro || LINEAR || — || align=right | 2.1 km || 
|-id=087 bgcolor=#fefefe
| 139087 ||  || — || March 18, 2001 || Socorro || LINEAR || — || align=right | 2.2 km || 
|-id=088 bgcolor=#fefefe
| 139088 ||  || — || March 19, 2001 || Socorro || LINEAR || NYS || align=right | 1.1 km || 
|-id=089 bgcolor=#fefefe
| 139089 ||  || — || March 19, 2001 || Socorro || LINEAR || FLO || align=right | 1.3 km || 
|-id=090 bgcolor=#fefefe
| 139090 ||  || — || March 19, 2001 || Socorro || LINEAR || — || align=right | 1.8 km || 
|-id=091 bgcolor=#fefefe
| 139091 ||  || — || March 21, 2001 || Haleakala || NEAT || NYS || align=right | 1.3 km || 
|-id=092 bgcolor=#FA8072
| 139092 ||  || — || March 20, 2001 || Socorro || LINEAR || PHO || align=right | 2.3 km || 
|-id=093 bgcolor=#fefefe
| 139093 ||  || — || March 18, 2001 || Socorro || LINEAR || EUT || align=right | 1.3 km || 
|-id=094 bgcolor=#fefefe
| 139094 ||  || — || March 18, 2001 || Socorro || LINEAR || — || align=right | 1.4 km || 
|-id=095 bgcolor=#fefefe
| 139095 ||  || — || March 18, 2001 || Socorro || LINEAR || MAS || align=right | 1.5 km || 
|-id=096 bgcolor=#fefefe
| 139096 ||  || — || March 18, 2001 || Socorro || LINEAR || NYS || align=right | 1.3 km || 
|-id=097 bgcolor=#fefefe
| 139097 ||  || — || March 18, 2001 || Socorro || LINEAR || V || align=right | 1.4 km || 
|-id=098 bgcolor=#fefefe
| 139098 ||  || — || March 18, 2001 || Socorro || LINEAR || — || align=right | 1.2 km || 
|-id=099 bgcolor=#fefefe
| 139099 ||  || — || March 18, 2001 || Socorro || LINEAR || FLO || align=right | 1.5 km || 
|-id=100 bgcolor=#E9E9E9
| 139100 ||  || — || March 18, 2001 || Socorro || LINEAR || — || align=right | 1.4 km || 
|}

139101–139200 

|-bgcolor=#fefefe
| 139101 ||  || — || March 18, 2001 || Socorro || LINEAR || V || align=right | 1.4 km || 
|-id=102 bgcolor=#fefefe
| 139102 ||  || — || March 18, 2001 || Socorro || LINEAR || — || align=right | 1.7 km || 
|-id=103 bgcolor=#fefefe
| 139103 ||  || — || March 18, 2001 || Socorro || LINEAR || — || align=right | 1.4 km || 
|-id=104 bgcolor=#fefefe
| 139104 ||  || — || March 18, 2001 || Socorro || LINEAR || — || align=right | 2.1 km || 
|-id=105 bgcolor=#fefefe
| 139105 ||  || — || March 18, 2001 || Socorro || LINEAR || NYS || align=right | 1.3 km || 
|-id=106 bgcolor=#fefefe
| 139106 ||  || — || March 18, 2001 || Socorro || LINEAR || NYS || align=right | 1.3 km || 
|-id=107 bgcolor=#fefefe
| 139107 ||  || — || March 18, 2001 || Socorro || LINEAR || ERI || align=right | 4.3 km || 
|-id=108 bgcolor=#fefefe
| 139108 ||  || — || March 18, 2001 || Socorro || LINEAR || — || align=right | 1.4 km || 
|-id=109 bgcolor=#fefefe
| 139109 ||  || — || March 18, 2001 || Socorro || LINEAR || — || align=right | 1.6 km || 
|-id=110 bgcolor=#fefefe
| 139110 ||  || — || March 18, 2001 || Socorro || LINEAR || — || align=right | 1.4 km || 
|-id=111 bgcolor=#fefefe
| 139111 ||  || — || March 18, 2001 || Socorro || LINEAR || — || align=right | 1.7 km || 
|-id=112 bgcolor=#E9E9E9
| 139112 ||  || — || March 18, 2001 || Socorro || LINEAR || BAR || align=right | 1.8 km || 
|-id=113 bgcolor=#fefefe
| 139113 ||  || — || March 19, 2001 || Socorro || LINEAR || NYS || align=right | 1.4 km || 
|-id=114 bgcolor=#fefefe
| 139114 ||  || — || March 21, 2001 || Haleakala || NEAT || — || align=right | 1.3 km || 
|-id=115 bgcolor=#E9E9E9
| 139115 ||  || — || March 19, 2001 || Socorro || LINEAR || — || align=right | 3.2 km || 
|-id=116 bgcolor=#fefefe
| 139116 ||  || — || March 19, 2001 || Socorro || LINEAR || V || align=right | 1.3 km || 
|-id=117 bgcolor=#fefefe
| 139117 ||  || — || March 19, 2001 || Socorro || LINEAR || — || align=right | 1.5 km || 
|-id=118 bgcolor=#fefefe
| 139118 ||  || — || March 19, 2001 || Socorro || LINEAR || NYS || align=right | 1.1 km || 
|-id=119 bgcolor=#fefefe
| 139119 ||  || — || March 19, 2001 || Socorro || LINEAR || V || align=right | 1.0 km || 
|-id=120 bgcolor=#fefefe
| 139120 ||  || — || March 19, 2001 || Socorro || LINEAR || NYS || align=right | 1.0 km || 
|-id=121 bgcolor=#fefefe
| 139121 ||  || — || March 19, 2001 || Socorro || LINEAR || NYS || align=right | 1.2 km || 
|-id=122 bgcolor=#fefefe
| 139122 ||  || — || March 19, 2001 || Socorro || LINEAR || FLO || align=right | 1.2 km || 
|-id=123 bgcolor=#fefefe
| 139123 ||  || — || March 19, 2001 || Socorro || LINEAR || — || align=right | 1.4 km || 
|-id=124 bgcolor=#fefefe
| 139124 ||  || — || March 19, 2001 || Socorro || LINEAR || — || align=right | 1.9 km || 
|-id=125 bgcolor=#fefefe
| 139125 ||  || — || March 19, 2001 || Socorro || LINEAR || — || align=right | 1.8 km || 
|-id=126 bgcolor=#fefefe
| 139126 ||  || — || March 19, 2001 || Socorro || LINEAR || NYS || align=right | 1.5 km || 
|-id=127 bgcolor=#fefefe
| 139127 ||  || — || March 19, 2001 || Socorro || LINEAR || — || align=right | 1.7 km || 
|-id=128 bgcolor=#fefefe
| 139128 ||  || — || March 19, 2001 || Socorro || LINEAR || — || align=right | 1.5 km || 
|-id=129 bgcolor=#fefefe
| 139129 ||  || — || March 19, 2001 || Socorro || LINEAR || — || align=right | 1.5 km || 
|-id=130 bgcolor=#fefefe
| 139130 ||  || — || March 19, 2001 || Socorro || LINEAR || FLO || align=right | 1.8 km || 
|-id=131 bgcolor=#fefefe
| 139131 ||  || — || March 19, 2001 || Socorro || LINEAR || FLO || align=right | 1.3 km || 
|-id=132 bgcolor=#fefefe
| 139132 ||  || — || March 19, 2001 || Socorro || LINEAR || — || align=right | 1.6 km || 
|-id=133 bgcolor=#fefefe
| 139133 ||  || — || March 19, 2001 || Socorro || LINEAR || V || align=right | 1.6 km || 
|-id=134 bgcolor=#fefefe
| 139134 ||  || — || March 19, 2001 || Socorro || LINEAR || FLO || align=right | 1.4 km || 
|-id=135 bgcolor=#fefefe
| 139135 ||  || — || March 19, 2001 || Socorro || LINEAR || — || align=right | 1.8 km || 
|-id=136 bgcolor=#E9E9E9
| 139136 ||  || — || March 19, 2001 || Socorro || LINEAR || — || align=right | 2.0 km || 
|-id=137 bgcolor=#fefefe
| 139137 ||  || — || March 23, 2001 || Socorro || LINEAR || V || align=right | 1.2 km || 
|-id=138 bgcolor=#fefefe
| 139138 ||  || — || March 26, 2001 || Kitt Peak || Spacewatch || NYS || align=right | 1.0 km || 
|-id=139 bgcolor=#E9E9E9
| 139139 ||  || — || March 26, 2001 || Kitt Peak || Spacewatch || — || align=right | 2.3 km || 
|-id=140 bgcolor=#fefefe
| 139140 ||  || — || March 21, 2001 || Anderson Mesa || LONEOS || — || align=right | 1.6 km || 
|-id=141 bgcolor=#fefefe
| 139141 ||  || — || March 21, 2001 || Anderson Mesa || LONEOS || V || align=right | 1.3 km || 
|-id=142 bgcolor=#fefefe
| 139142 ||  || — || March 26, 2001 || Kitt Peak || Spacewatch || — || align=right | 1.6 km || 
|-id=143 bgcolor=#E9E9E9
| 139143 ||  || — || March 27, 2001 || Desert Beaver || W. K. Y. Yeung || MIT || align=right | 4.1 km || 
|-id=144 bgcolor=#fefefe
| 139144 ||  || — || March 16, 2001 || Socorro || LINEAR || ERI || align=right | 4.0 km || 
|-id=145 bgcolor=#fefefe
| 139145 ||  || — || March 16, 2001 || Socorro || LINEAR || — || align=right | 2.0 km || 
|-id=146 bgcolor=#fefefe
| 139146 ||  || — || March 16, 2001 || Socorro || LINEAR || FLO || align=right | 1.5 km || 
|-id=147 bgcolor=#fefefe
| 139147 ||  || — || March 16, 2001 || Socorro || LINEAR || — || align=right | 2.5 km || 
|-id=148 bgcolor=#fefefe
| 139148 ||  || — || March 16, 2001 || Socorro || LINEAR || V || align=right | 1.1 km || 
|-id=149 bgcolor=#fefefe
| 139149 ||  || — || March 16, 2001 || Socorro || LINEAR || — || align=right | 2.1 km || 
|-id=150 bgcolor=#fefefe
| 139150 ||  || — || March 16, 2001 || Socorro || LINEAR || — || align=right | 1.8 km || 
|-id=151 bgcolor=#E9E9E9
| 139151 ||  || — || March 16, 2001 || Socorro || LINEAR || — || align=right | 2.0 km || 
|-id=152 bgcolor=#E9E9E9
| 139152 ||  || — || March 16, 2001 || Socorro || LINEAR || — || align=right | 2.5 km || 
|-id=153 bgcolor=#fefefe
| 139153 ||  || — || March 17, 2001 || Socorro || LINEAR || — || align=right | 2.0 km || 
|-id=154 bgcolor=#fefefe
| 139154 ||  || — || March 18, 2001 || Socorro || LINEAR || — || align=right | 3.5 km || 
|-id=155 bgcolor=#fefefe
| 139155 ||  || — || March 18, 2001 || Socorro || LINEAR || V || align=right | 1.2 km || 
|-id=156 bgcolor=#fefefe
| 139156 ||  || — || March 18, 2001 || Socorro || LINEAR || FLO || align=right | 1.3 km || 
|-id=157 bgcolor=#fefefe
| 139157 ||  || — || March 18, 2001 || Anderson Mesa || LONEOS || FLO || align=right | 1.1 km || 
|-id=158 bgcolor=#fefefe
| 139158 ||  || — || March 18, 2001 || Socorro || LINEAR || MAS || align=right | 1.4 km || 
|-id=159 bgcolor=#fefefe
| 139159 ||  || — || March 18, 2001 || Socorro || LINEAR || — || align=right | 1.4 km || 
|-id=160 bgcolor=#fefefe
| 139160 ||  || — || March 18, 2001 || Socorro || LINEAR || FLO || align=right | 1.1 km || 
|-id=161 bgcolor=#fefefe
| 139161 ||  || — || March 18, 2001 || Haleakala || NEAT || V || align=right | 1.3 km || 
|-id=162 bgcolor=#fefefe
| 139162 ||  || — || March 19, 2001 || Anderson Mesa || LONEOS || NYS || align=right | 1.1 km || 
|-id=163 bgcolor=#fefefe
| 139163 ||  || — || March 19, 2001 || Anderson Mesa || LONEOS || MAS || align=right | 1.1 km || 
|-id=164 bgcolor=#fefefe
| 139164 ||  || — || March 19, 2001 || Anderson Mesa || LONEOS || FLO || align=right | 1.2 km || 
|-id=165 bgcolor=#fefefe
| 139165 ||  || — || March 19, 2001 || Anderson Mesa || LONEOS || V || align=right | 1.1 km || 
|-id=166 bgcolor=#fefefe
| 139166 ||  || — || March 20, 2001 || Socorro || LINEAR || FLO || align=right | 1.1 km || 
|-id=167 bgcolor=#fefefe
| 139167 ||  || — || March 23, 2001 || Anderson Mesa || LONEOS || — || align=right | 1.6 km || 
|-id=168 bgcolor=#fefefe
| 139168 ||  || — || March 23, 2001 || Anderson Mesa || LONEOS || V || align=right | 1.1 km || 
|-id=169 bgcolor=#fefefe
| 139169 ||  || — || March 24, 2001 || Anderson Mesa || LONEOS || V || align=right | 1.1 km || 
|-id=170 bgcolor=#fefefe
| 139170 ||  || — || March 26, 2001 || Socorro || LINEAR || — || align=right | 2.2 km || 
|-id=171 bgcolor=#fefefe
| 139171 ||  || — || March 26, 2001 || Socorro || LINEAR || NYS || align=right | 1.0 km || 
|-id=172 bgcolor=#fefefe
| 139172 ||  || — || March 26, 2001 || Socorro || LINEAR || — || align=right | 1.7 km || 
|-id=173 bgcolor=#fefefe
| 139173 ||  || — || March 29, 2001 || Socorro || LINEAR || — || align=right | 1.2 km || 
|-id=174 bgcolor=#fefefe
| 139174 ||  || — || March 20, 2001 || Haleakala || NEAT || ERI || align=right | 3.4 km || 
|-id=175 bgcolor=#fefefe
| 139175 ||  || — || March 20, 2001 || Haleakala || NEAT || V || align=right data-sort-value="0.98" | 980 m || 
|-id=176 bgcolor=#fefefe
| 139176 ||  || — || March 20, 2001 || Haleakala || NEAT || V || align=right | 1.3 km || 
|-id=177 bgcolor=#fefefe
| 139177 ||  || — || March 21, 2001 || Anderson Mesa || LONEOS || NYS || align=right | 1.4 km || 
|-id=178 bgcolor=#fefefe
| 139178 ||  || — || March 21, 2001 || Anderson Mesa || LONEOS || NYS || align=right | 3.8 km || 
|-id=179 bgcolor=#fefefe
| 139179 ||  || — || March 21, 2001 || Anderson Mesa || LONEOS || NYS || align=right | 1.2 km || 
|-id=180 bgcolor=#E9E9E9
| 139180 ||  || — || March 21, 2001 || Anderson Mesa || LONEOS || — || align=right | 3.2 km || 
|-id=181 bgcolor=#fefefe
| 139181 ||  || — || March 21, 2001 || Anderson Mesa || LONEOS || — || align=right | 1.6 km || 
|-id=182 bgcolor=#d6d6d6
| 139182 ||  || — || March 21, 2001 || Anderson Mesa || LONEOS || EOS || align=right | 3.4 km || 
|-id=183 bgcolor=#fefefe
| 139183 ||  || — || March 22, 2001 || Kitt Peak || Spacewatch || — || align=right data-sort-value="0.98" | 980 m || 
|-id=184 bgcolor=#d6d6d6
| 139184 ||  || — || March 23, 2001 || Anderson Mesa || LONEOS || — || align=right | 3.2 km || 
|-id=185 bgcolor=#fefefe
| 139185 ||  || — || March 23, 2001 || Anderson Mesa || LONEOS || ERI || align=right | 3.4 km || 
|-id=186 bgcolor=#fefefe
| 139186 ||  || — || March 23, 2001 || Anderson Mesa || LONEOS || — || align=right | 1.6 km || 
|-id=187 bgcolor=#fefefe
| 139187 ||  || — || March 24, 2001 || Anderson Mesa || LONEOS || — || align=right | 1.5 km || 
|-id=188 bgcolor=#fefefe
| 139188 ||  || — || March 24, 2001 || Anderson Mesa || LONEOS || — || align=right | 1.5 km || 
|-id=189 bgcolor=#fefefe
| 139189 ||  || — || March 24, 2001 || Anderson Mesa || LONEOS || FLO || align=right | 1.2 km || 
|-id=190 bgcolor=#fefefe
| 139190 ||  || — || March 24, 2001 || Haleakala || NEAT || — || align=right | 6.6 km || 
|-id=191 bgcolor=#fefefe
| 139191 ||  || — || March 26, 2001 || Socorro || LINEAR || FLO || align=right | 1.3 km || 
|-id=192 bgcolor=#fefefe
| 139192 ||  || — || March 26, 2001 || Socorro || LINEAR || — || align=right | 1.5 km || 
|-id=193 bgcolor=#fefefe
| 139193 ||  || — || March 26, 2001 || Haleakala || NEAT || — || align=right | 1.7 km || 
|-id=194 bgcolor=#fefefe
| 139194 ||  || — || March 27, 2001 || Anderson Mesa || LONEOS || V || align=right | 1.2 km || 
|-id=195 bgcolor=#fefefe
| 139195 ||  || — || March 27, 2001 || Haleakala || NEAT || — || align=right | 1.7 km || 
|-id=196 bgcolor=#fefefe
| 139196 ||  || — || March 29, 2001 || Haleakala || NEAT || NYS || align=right | 1.4 km || 
|-id=197 bgcolor=#fefefe
| 139197 ||  || — || March 30, 2001 || Socorro || LINEAR || — || align=right | 2.1 km || 
|-id=198 bgcolor=#E9E9E9
| 139198 ||  || — || March 31, 2001 || Kitt Peak || Spacewatch || — || align=right | 1.7 km || 
|-id=199 bgcolor=#fefefe
| 139199 ||  || — || March 18, 2001 || Anderson Mesa || LONEOS || — || align=right | 1.3 km || 
|-id=200 bgcolor=#fefefe
| 139200 ||  || — || March 18, 2001 || Haleakala || NEAT || — || align=right | 4.1 km || 
|}

139201–139300 

|-bgcolor=#fefefe
| 139201 ||  || — || March 19, 2001 || Anderson Mesa || LONEOS || V || align=right | 1.2 km || 
|-id=202 bgcolor=#fefefe
| 139202 ||  || — || March 19, 2001 || Anderson Mesa || LONEOS || V || align=right | 1.2 km || 
|-id=203 bgcolor=#fefefe
| 139203 ||  || — || March 19, 2001 || Socorro || LINEAR || — || align=right | 2.2 km || 
|-id=204 bgcolor=#E9E9E9
| 139204 ||  || — || March 23, 2001 || Haleakala || NEAT || — || align=right | 3.4 km || 
|-id=205 bgcolor=#fefefe
| 139205 ||  || — || March 20, 2001 || Anderson Mesa || LONEOS || V || align=right | 1.3 km || 
|-id=206 bgcolor=#fefefe
| 139206 ||  || — || March 16, 2001 || Socorro || LINEAR || — || align=right | 1.7 km || 
|-id=207 bgcolor=#fefefe
| 139207 ||  || — || March 20, 2001 || Anderson Mesa || LONEOS || — || align=right | 1.7 km || 
|-id=208 bgcolor=#fefefe
| 139208 ||  || — || March 22, 2001 || Kitt Peak || Spacewatch || MAS || align=right | 1.1 km || 
|-id=209 bgcolor=#fefefe
| 139209 ||  || — || March 20, 2001 || Anderson Mesa || LONEOS || V || align=right | 1.1 km || 
|-id=210 bgcolor=#fefefe
| 139210 || 2001 GJ || — || April 1, 2001 || Socorro || LINEAR || — || align=right | 1.2 km || 
|-id=211 bgcolor=#FFC2E0
| 139211 ||  || — || April 12, 2001 || Socorro || LINEAR || AMO +1kmPHA || align=right data-sort-value="0.93" | 930 m || 
|-id=212 bgcolor=#E9E9E9
| 139212 ||  || — || April 14, 2001 || Socorro || LINEAR || — || align=right | 3.2 km || 
|-id=213 bgcolor=#E9E9E9
| 139213 ||  || — || April 15, 2001 || Socorro || LINEAR || — || align=right | 2.3 km || 
|-id=214 bgcolor=#E9E9E9
| 139214 ||  || — || April 15, 2001 || Socorro || LINEAR || — || align=right | 3.4 km || 
|-id=215 bgcolor=#fefefe
| 139215 ||  || — || April 15, 2001 || Socorro || LINEAR || — || align=right | 1.7 km || 
|-id=216 bgcolor=#E9E9E9
| 139216 ||  || — || April 15, 2001 || Haleakala || NEAT || — || align=right | 2.7 km || 
|-id=217 bgcolor=#fefefe
| 139217 ||  || — || April 15, 2001 || Haleakala || NEAT || — || align=right | 1.9 km || 
|-id=218 bgcolor=#fefefe
| 139218 ||  || — || April 1, 2001 || Kitt Peak || Spacewatch || — || align=right | 1.7 km || 
|-id=219 bgcolor=#E9E9E9
| 139219 || 2001 HF || — || April 16, 2001 || Socorro || LINEAR || — || align=right | 4.0 km || 
|-id=220 bgcolor=#E9E9E9
| 139220 ||  || — || April 16, 2001 || Socorro || LINEAR || — || align=right | 1.9 km || 
|-id=221 bgcolor=#fefefe
| 139221 ||  || — || April 17, 2001 || Socorro || LINEAR || NYS || align=right | 1.2 km || 
|-id=222 bgcolor=#fefefe
| 139222 ||  || — || April 17, 2001 || Desert Beaver || W. K. Y. Yeung || — || align=right | 2.0 km || 
|-id=223 bgcolor=#fefefe
| 139223 ||  || — || April 16, 2001 || Socorro || LINEAR || — || align=right | 1.5 km || 
|-id=224 bgcolor=#fefefe
| 139224 ||  || — || April 18, 2001 || Socorro || LINEAR || — || align=right | 2.0 km || 
|-id=225 bgcolor=#E9E9E9
| 139225 ||  || — || April 18, 2001 || Socorro || LINEAR || — || align=right | 2.7 km || 
|-id=226 bgcolor=#E9E9E9
| 139226 ||  || — || April 18, 2001 || Socorro || LINEAR || — || align=right | 3.8 km || 
|-id=227 bgcolor=#E9E9E9
| 139227 ||  || — || April 18, 2001 || Kitt Peak || Spacewatch || — || align=right | 3.1 km || 
|-id=228 bgcolor=#fefefe
| 139228 ||  || — || April 18, 2001 || Socorro || LINEAR || NYS || align=right | 1.3 km || 
|-id=229 bgcolor=#fefefe
| 139229 ||  || — || April 21, 2001 || Socorro || LINEAR || — || align=right | 1.7 km || 
|-id=230 bgcolor=#fefefe
| 139230 ||  || — || April 25, 2001 || Badlands || R. Dyvig || V || align=right | 1.2 km || 
|-id=231 bgcolor=#fefefe
| 139231 ||  || — || April 22, 2001 || San Marcello || L. Tesi, M. Tombelli || — || align=right | 1.4 km || 
|-id=232 bgcolor=#fefefe
| 139232 ||  || — || April 24, 2001 || Kitt Peak || Spacewatch || V || align=right | 1.1 km || 
|-id=233 bgcolor=#E9E9E9
| 139233 ||  || — || April 25, 2001 || Ondřejov || P. Kušnirák, P. Pravec || — || align=right | 3.2 km || 
|-id=234 bgcolor=#fefefe
| 139234 ||  || — || April 24, 2001 || Kitt Peak || Spacewatch || — || align=right | 1.8 km || 
|-id=235 bgcolor=#fefefe
| 139235 ||  || — || April 23, 2001 || Socorro || LINEAR || — || align=right | 1.5 km || 
|-id=236 bgcolor=#fefefe
| 139236 ||  || — || April 23, 2001 || Socorro || LINEAR || FLO || align=right data-sort-value="0.93" | 930 m || 
|-id=237 bgcolor=#fefefe
| 139237 ||  || — || April 24, 2001 || Socorro || LINEAR || EUT || align=right | 1.3 km || 
|-id=238 bgcolor=#fefefe
| 139238 ||  || — || April 25, 2001 || Desert Beaver || W. K. Y. Yeung || NYS || align=right | 1.8 km || 
|-id=239 bgcolor=#fefefe
| 139239 ||  || — || April 23, 2001 || Kitt Peak || Spacewatch || — || align=right | 1.1 km || 
|-id=240 bgcolor=#fefefe
| 139240 ||  || — || April 27, 2001 || Socorro || LINEAR || NYS || align=right | 1.3 km || 
|-id=241 bgcolor=#fefefe
| 139241 ||  || — || April 27, 2001 || Socorro || LINEAR || — || align=right | 1.6 km || 
|-id=242 bgcolor=#E9E9E9
| 139242 ||  || — || April 27, 2001 || Socorro || LINEAR || — || align=right | 2.5 km || 
|-id=243 bgcolor=#fefefe
| 139243 ||  || — || April 27, 2001 || Socorro || LINEAR || NYS || align=right | 1.4 km || 
|-id=244 bgcolor=#fefefe
| 139244 ||  || — || April 24, 2001 || Ondřejov || P. Pravec || FLO || align=right | 1.0 km || 
|-id=245 bgcolor=#E9E9E9
| 139245 ||  || — || April 26, 2001 || Kitt Peak || Spacewatch || — || align=right | 3.2 km || 
|-id=246 bgcolor=#fefefe
| 139246 ||  || — || April 23, 2001 || Socorro || LINEAR || V || align=right | 1.2 km || 
|-id=247 bgcolor=#fefefe
| 139247 ||  || — || April 23, 2001 || Socorro || LINEAR || — || align=right | 1.7 km || 
|-id=248 bgcolor=#E9E9E9
| 139248 ||  || — || April 27, 2001 || Socorro || LINEAR || — || align=right | 2.5 km || 
|-id=249 bgcolor=#fefefe
| 139249 ||  || — || April 27, 2001 || Socorro || LINEAR || — || align=right | 2.5 km || 
|-id=250 bgcolor=#fefefe
| 139250 ||  || — || April 29, 2001 || Socorro || LINEAR || MAS || align=right | 1.4 km || 
|-id=251 bgcolor=#fefefe
| 139251 ||  || — || April 26, 2001 || Kitt Peak || Spacewatch || — || align=right | 1.2 km || 
|-id=252 bgcolor=#fefefe
| 139252 ||  || — || April 26, 2001 || Kitt Peak || Spacewatch || V || align=right | 1.1 km || 
|-id=253 bgcolor=#fefefe
| 139253 ||  || — || April 26, 2001 || Kitt Peak || Spacewatch || V || align=right | 1.3 km || 
|-id=254 bgcolor=#E9E9E9
| 139254 ||  || — || April 30, 2001 || Kitt Peak || Spacewatch || — || align=right | 1.8 km || 
|-id=255 bgcolor=#fefefe
| 139255 ||  || — || April 16, 2001 || Anderson Mesa || LONEOS || — || align=right | 1.3 km || 
|-id=256 bgcolor=#E9E9E9
| 139256 ||  || — || April 17, 2001 || Anderson Mesa || LONEOS || GER || align=right | 2.0 km || 
|-id=257 bgcolor=#fefefe
| 139257 ||  || — || April 18, 2001 || Socorro || LINEAR || — || align=right | 1.8 km || 
|-id=258 bgcolor=#fefefe
| 139258 ||  || — || April 18, 2001 || Kitt Peak || Spacewatch || — || align=right | 1.9 km || 
|-id=259 bgcolor=#fefefe
| 139259 ||  || — || April 18, 2001 || Haleakala || NEAT || — || align=right | 1.6 km || 
|-id=260 bgcolor=#fefefe
| 139260 ||  || — || April 21, 2001 || Socorro || LINEAR || — || align=right | 1.9 km || 
|-id=261 bgcolor=#fefefe
| 139261 ||  || — || April 23, 2001 || Socorro || LINEAR || — || align=right | 1.2 km || 
|-id=262 bgcolor=#fefefe
| 139262 ||  || — || April 23, 2001 || Socorro || LINEAR || FLO || align=right | 1.1 km || 
|-id=263 bgcolor=#E9E9E9
| 139263 ||  || — || April 24, 2001 || Anderson Mesa || LONEOS || ADE || align=right | 5.2 km || 
|-id=264 bgcolor=#fefefe
| 139264 ||  || — || April 24, 2001 || Socorro || LINEAR || — || align=right | 1.9 km || 
|-id=265 bgcolor=#fefefe
| 139265 ||  || — || April 24, 2001 || Socorro || LINEAR || — || align=right | 1.5 km || 
|-id=266 bgcolor=#fefefe
| 139266 ||  || — || April 24, 2001 || Socorro || LINEAR || — || align=right | 1.7 km || 
|-id=267 bgcolor=#fefefe
| 139267 ||  || — || April 24, 2001 || Haleakala || NEAT || NYS || align=right | 1.3 km || 
|-id=268 bgcolor=#fefefe
| 139268 ||  || — || April 24, 2001 || Haleakala || NEAT || — || align=right | 1.5 km || 
|-id=269 bgcolor=#fefefe
| 139269 ||  || — || April 23, 2001 || Socorro || LINEAR || FLO || align=right | 1.1 km || 
|-id=270 bgcolor=#E9E9E9
| 139270 ||  || — || April 24, 2001 || Haleakala || NEAT || JUN || align=right | 1.7 km || 
|-id=271 bgcolor=#fefefe
| 139271 ||  || — || April 26, 2001 || Anderson Mesa || LONEOS || FLO || align=right | 1.2 km || 
|-id=272 bgcolor=#fefefe
| 139272 ||  || — || April 26, 2001 || Anderson Mesa || LONEOS || V || align=right | 1.6 km || 
|-id=273 bgcolor=#fefefe
| 139273 ||  || — || April 26, 2001 || Anderson Mesa || LONEOS || — || align=right | 1.8 km || 
|-id=274 bgcolor=#E9E9E9
| 139274 ||  || — || April 26, 2001 || Haleakala || NEAT || — || align=right | 1.9 km || 
|-id=275 bgcolor=#fefefe
| 139275 ||  || — || April 27, 2001 || Kitt Peak || Spacewatch || NYS || align=right | 1.3 km || 
|-id=276 bgcolor=#fefefe
| 139276 ||  || — || April 27, 2001 || Haleakala || NEAT || NYS || align=right | 1.3 km || 
|-id=277 bgcolor=#fefefe
| 139277 || 2001 JJ || — || May 2, 2001 || Palomar || NEAT || — || align=right | 1.0 km || 
|-id=278 bgcolor=#E9E9E9
| 139278 ||  || — || May 15, 2001 || Kitt Peak || Spacewatch || — || align=right | 2.0 km || 
|-id=279 bgcolor=#E9E9E9
| 139279 ||  || — || May 15, 2001 || Palomar || NEAT || — || align=right | 2.1 km || 
|-id=280 bgcolor=#fefefe
| 139280 ||  || — || May 14, 2001 || Haleakala || NEAT || NYS || align=right | 1.3 km || 
|-id=281 bgcolor=#fefefe
| 139281 ||  || — || May 15, 2001 || Anderson Mesa || LONEOS || FLO || align=right | 1.3 km || 
|-id=282 bgcolor=#fefefe
| 139282 ||  || — || May 15, 2001 || Anderson Mesa || LONEOS || — || align=right | 1.2 km || 
|-id=283 bgcolor=#fefefe
| 139283 ||  || — || May 11, 2001 || Haleakala || NEAT || NYS || align=right | 1.3 km || 
|-id=284 bgcolor=#fefefe
| 139284 ||  || — || May 14, 2001 || Palomar || NEAT || — || align=right | 3.1 km || 
|-id=285 bgcolor=#E9E9E9
| 139285 ||  || — || May 15, 2001 || Anderson Mesa || LONEOS || — || align=right | 2.5 km || 
|-id=286 bgcolor=#E9E9E9
| 139286 ||  || — || May 15, 2001 || Anderson Mesa || LONEOS || — || align=right | 3.1 km || 
|-id=287 bgcolor=#fefefe
| 139287 ||  || — || May 15, 2001 || Palomar || NEAT || — || align=right | 1.7 km || 
|-id=288 bgcolor=#E9E9E9
| 139288 ||  || — || May 15, 2001 || Anderson Mesa || LONEOS || JUN || align=right | 1.8 km || 
|-id=289 bgcolor=#FFC2E0
| 139289 ||  || — || May 18, 2001 || Anderson Mesa || LONEOS || APO +1km || align=right | 1.1 km || 
|-id=290 bgcolor=#E9E9E9
| 139290 ||  || — || May 20, 2001 || Ondřejov || P. Pravec, P. Kušnirák || — || align=right | 2.3 km || 
|-id=291 bgcolor=#fefefe
| 139291 ||  || — || May 17, 2001 || Socorro || LINEAR || V || align=right | 2.0 km || 
|-id=292 bgcolor=#E9E9E9
| 139292 ||  || — || May 17, 2001 || Socorro || LINEAR || — || align=right | 2.9 km || 
|-id=293 bgcolor=#fefefe
| 139293 ||  || — || May 17, 2001 || Socorro || LINEAR || V || align=right | 1.2 km || 
|-id=294 bgcolor=#E9E9E9
| 139294 ||  || — || May 17, 2001 || Socorro || LINEAR || — || align=right | 2.0 km || 
|-id=295 bgcolor=#E9E9E9
| 139295 ||  || — || May 17, 2001 || Socorro || LINEAR || — || align=right | 1.8 km || 
|-id=296 bgcolor=#E9E9E9
| 139296 ||  || — || May 17, 2001 || Socorro || LINEAR || — || align=right | 2.4 km || 
|-id=297 bgcolor=#fefefe
| 139297 ||  || — || May 18, 2001 || Socorro || LINEAR || ERI || align=right | 2.7 km || 
|-id=298 bgcolor=#fefefe
| 139298 ||  || — || May 18, 2001 || Socorro || LINEAR || ERI || align=right | 3.0 km || 
|-id=299 bgcolor=#fefefe
| 139299 ||  || — || May 18, 2001 || Socorro || LINEAR || — || align=right | 2.0 km || 
|-id=300 bgcolor=#E9E9E9
| 139300 ||  || — || May 18, 2001 || Socorro || LINEAR || — || align=right | 4.2 km || 
|}

139301–139400 

|-bgcolor=#E9E9E9
| 139301 ||  || — || May 18, 2001 || Socorro || LINEAR || — || align=right | 2.0 km || 
|-id=302 bgcolor=#fefefe
| 139302 ||  || — || May 18, 2001 || Socorro || LINEAR || NYS || align=right | 1.1 km || 
|-id=303 bgcolor=#fefefe
| 139303 ||  || — || May 18, 2001 || Socorro || LINEAR || ERI || align=right | 2.5 km || 
|-id=304 bgcolor=#fefefe
| 139304 ||  || — || May 21, 2001 || Socorro || LINEAR || — || align=right | 1.2 km || 
|-id=305 bgcolor=#fefefe
| 139305 ||  || — || May 18, 2001 || Anderson Mesa || LONEOS || — || align=right | 2.2 km || 
|-id=306 bgcolor=#fefefe
| 139306 ||  || — || May 22, 2001 || Reedy Creek || J. Broughton || — || align=right | 2.0 km || 
|-id=307 bgcolor=#fefefe
| 139307 ||  || — || May 18, 2001 || Socorro || LINEAR || NYS || align=right | 1.5 km || 
|-id=308 bgcolor=#fefefe
| 139308 ||  || — || May 22, 2001 || Wise || Wise Obs. || V || align=right | 1.4 km || 
|-id=309 bgcolor=#E9E9E9
| 139309 ||  || — || May 17, 2001 || Socorro || LINEAR || — || align=right | 1.7 km || 
|-id=310 bgcolor=#fefefe
| 139310 ||  || — || May 17, 2001 || Socorro || LINEAR || — || align=right | 1.7 km || 
|-id=311 bgcolor=#fefefe
| 139311 ||  || — || May 17, 2001 || Socorro || LINEAR || NYS || align=right | 1.1 km || 
|-id=312 bgcolor=#fefefe
| 139312 ||  || — || May 17, 2001 || Socorro || LINEAR || V || align=right | 1.2 km || 
|-id=313 bgcolor=#fefefe
| 139313 ||  || — || May 17, 2001 || Socorro || LINEAR || — || align=right | 2.0 km || 
|-id=314 bgcolor=#E9E9E9
| 139314 ||  || — || May 17, 2001 || Socorro || LINEAR || — || align=right | 1.4 km || 
|-id=315 bgcolor=#fefefe
| 139315 ||  || — || May 17, 2001 || Socorro || LINEAR || — || align=right | 1.6 km || 
|-id=316 bgcolor=#E9E9E9
| 139316 ||  || — || May 17, 2001 || Socorro || LINEAR || — || align=right | 1.6 km || 
|-id=317 bgcolor=#E9E9E9
| 139317 ||  || — || May 17, 2001 || Socorro || LINEAR || — || align=right | 2.5 km || 
|-id=318 bgcolor=#E9E9E9
| 139318 ||  || — || May 17, 2001 || Socorro || LINEAR || — || align=right | 3.8 km || 
|-id=319 bgcolor=#fefefe
| 139319 ||  || — || May 17, 2001 || Socorro || LINEAR || MAS || align=right | 1.4 km || 
|-id=320 bgcolor=#fefefe
| 139320 ||  || — || May 21, 2001 || Socorro || LINEAR || — || align=right | 1.6 km || 
|-id=321 bgcolor=#fefefe
| 139321 ||  || — || May 21, 2001 || Socorro || LINEAR || MAS || align=right | 1.4 km || 
|-id=322 bgcolor=#fefefe
| 139322 ||  || — || May 23, 2001 || Socorro || LINEAR || — || align=right | 1.5 km || 
|-id=323 bgcolor=#E9E9E9
| 139323 ||  || — || May 23, 2001 || Socorro || LINEAR || JUN || align=right | 3.4 km || 
|-id=324 bgcolor=#fefefe
| 139324 ||  || — || May 24, 2001 || Kitt Peak || Spacewatch || — || align=right | 1.6 km || 
|-id=325 bgcolor=#fefefe
| 139325 ||  || — || May 24, 2001 || Kitt Peak || Spacewatch || — || align=right | 1.1 km || 
|-id=326 bgcolor=#E9E9E9
| 139326 ||  || — || May 18, 2001 || Socorro || LINEAR || — || align=right | 1.5 km || 
|-id=327 bgcolor=#fefefe
| 139327 ||  || — || May 18, 2001 || Socorro || LINEAR || — || align=right | 1.4 km || 
|-id=328 bgcolor=#E9E9E9
| 139328 ||  || — || May 21, 2001 || Socorro || LINEAR || — || align=right | 3.0 km || 
|-id=329 bgcolor=#E9E9E9
| 139329 ||  || — || May 21, 2001 || Socorro || LINEAR || — || align=right | 4.3 km || 
|-id=330 bgcolor=#E9E9E9
| 139330 ||  || — || May 22, 2001 || Socorro || LINEAR || — || align=right | 4.8 km || 
|-id=331 bgcolor=#fefefe
| 139331 ||  || — || May 22, 2001 || Socorro || LINEAR || — || align=right | 2.1 km || 
|-id=332 bgcolor=#E9E9E9
| 139332 ||  || — || May 22, 2001 || Socorro || LINEAR || — || align=right | 1.8 km || 
|-id=333 bgcolor=#E9E9E9
| 139333 ||  || — || May 23, 2001 || Socorro || LINEAR || EUN || align=right | 2.4 km || 
|-id=334 bgcolor=#E9E9E9
| 139334 ||  || — || May 20, 2001 || Haleakala || NEAT || — || align=right | 3.9 km || 
|-id=335 bgcolor=#E9E9E9
| 139335 ||  || — || May 17, 2001 || Haleakala || NEAT || — || align=right | 2.6 km || 
|-id=336 bgcolor=#fefefe
| 139336 ||  || — || May 18, 2001 || Socorro || LINEAR || — || align=right | 1.6 km || 
|-id=337 bgcolor=#fefefe
| 139337 ||  || — || May 18, 2001 || Socorro || LINEAR || V || align=right | 1.0 km || 
|-id=338 bgcolor=#E9E9E9
| 139338 ||  || — || May 20, 2001 || Haleakala || NEAT || — || align=right | 5.7 km || 
|-id=339 bgcolor=#E9E9E9
| 139339 ||  || — || May 23, 2001 || Socorro || LINEAR || — || align=right | 1.9 km || 
|-id=340 bgcolor=#E9E9E9
| 139340 ||  || — || May 26, 2001 || Socorro || LINEAR || RAF || align=right | 1.8 km || 
|-id=341 bgcolor=#E9E9E9
| 139341 ||  || — || May 26, 2001 || Socorro || LINEAR || — || align=right | 1.4 km || 
|-id=342 bgcolor=#fefefe
| 139342 ||  || — || May 27, 2001 || Haleakala || NEAT || — || align=right | 1.7 km || 
|-id=343 bgcolor=#fefefe
| 139343 ||  || — || May 18, 2001 || Socorro || LINEAR || — || align=right | 1.7 km || 
|-id=344 bgcolor=#fefefe
| 139344 ||  || — || May 22, 2001 || Anderson Mesa || LONEOS || — || align=right | 3.4 km || 
|-id=345 bgcolor=#FFC2E0
| 139345 ||  || — || May 30, 2001 || Anderson Mesa || LONEOS || APO +1km || align=right | 2.6 km || 
|-id=346 bgcolor=#E9E9E9
| 139346 ||  || — || May 23, 2001 || Kitt Peak || Spacewatch || — || align=right | 2.6 km || 
|-id=347 bgcolor=#E9E9E9
| 139347 ||  || — || May 24, 2001 || Anderson Mesa || LONEOS || — || align=right | 1.7 km || 
|-id=348 bgcolor=#E9E9E9
| 139348 ||  || — || May 25, 2001 || Socorro || LINEAR || — || align=right | 1.5 km || 
|-id=349 bgcolor=#fefefe
| 139349 ||  || — || May 26, 2001 || Socorro || LINEAR || NYS || align=right | 1.3 km || 
|-id=350 bgcolor=#E9E9E9
| 139350 ||  || — || May 31, 2001 || Palomar || NEAT || — || align=right | 1.8 km || 
|-id=351 bgcolor=#E9E9E9
| 139351 ||  || — || June 14, 2001 || Palomar || NEAT || — || align=right | 4.8 km || 
|-id=352 bgcolor=#E9E9E9
| 139352 ||  || — || June 15, 2001 || Palomar || NEAT || HNS || align=right | 2.5 km || 
|-id=353 bgcolor=#E9E9E9
| 139353 ||  || — || June 15, 2001 || Socorro || LINEAR || ADE || align=right | 2.5 km || 
|-id=354 bgcolor=#E9E9E9
| 139354 ||  || — || June 15, 2001 || Socorro || LINEAR || ADE || align=right | 2.8 km || 
|-id=355 bgcolor=#E9E9E9
| 139355 ||  || — || June 15, 2001 || Socorro || LINEAR || — || align=right | 5.8 km || 
|-id=356 bgcolor=#E9E9E9
| 139356 ||  || — || June 15, 2001 || Socorro || LINEAR || — || align=right | 2.1 km || 
|-id=357 bgcolor=#fefefe
| 139357 ||  || — || June 12, 2001 || Haleakala || NEAT || — || align=right | 1.4 km || 
|-id=358 bgcolor=#E9E9E9
| 139358 ||  || — || June 13, 2001 || Anderson Mesa || LONEOS || MAR || align=right | 2.1 km || 
|-id=359 bgcolor=#FFC2E0
| 139359 ||  || — || June 16, 2001 || Socorro || LINEAR || APO +1kmPHA || align=right | 1.8 km || 
|-id=360 bgcolor=#E9E9E9
| 139360 ||  || — || June 16, 2001 || Palomar || NEAT || — || align=right | 2.1 km || 
|-id=361 bgcolor=#E9E9E9
| 139361 ||  || — || June 16, 2001 || Palomar || NEAT || — || align=right | 2.2 km || 
|-id=362 bgcolor=#E9E9E9
| 139362 ||  || — || June 21, 2001 || Palomar || NEAT || — || align=right | 4.5 km || 
|-id=363 bgcolor=#E9E9E9
| 139363 ||  || — || June 20, 2001 || Haleakala || NEAT || GEF || align=right | 2.3 km || 
|-id=364 bgcolor=#E9E9E9
| 139364 ||  || — || June 24, 2001 || Desert Beaver || W. K. Y. Yeung || — || align=right | 3.2 km || 
|-id=365 bgcolor=#E9E9E9
| 139365 ||  || — || June 19, 2001 || Palomar || NEAT || — || align=right | 4.4 km || 
|-id=366 bgcolor=#E9E9E9
| 139366 ||  || — || June 20, 2001 || Palomar || NEAT || XIZ || align=right | 2.4 km || 
|-id=367 bgcolor=#E9E9E9
| 139367 ||  || — || June 21, 2001 || Palomar || NEAT || — || align=right | 2.9 km || 
|-id=368 bgcolor=#E9E9E9
| 139368 ||  || — || June 21, 2001 || Palomar || NEAT || — || align=right | 3.2 km || 
|-id=369 bgcolor=#E9E9E9
| 139369 ||  || — || June 24, 2001 || Kitt Peak || Spacewatch || — || align=right | 1.9 km || 
|-id=370 bgcolor=#E9E9E9
| 139370 ||  || — || June 28, 2001 || Anderson Mesa || LONEOS || MRX || align=right | 2.1 km || 
|-id=371 bgcolor=#E9E9E9
| 139371 ||  || — || June 27, 2001 || Palomar || NEAT || — || align=right | 3.8 km || 
|-id=372 bgcolor=#E9E9E9
| 139372 ||  || — || June 27, 2001 || Palomar || NEAT || — || align=right | 2.4 km || 
|-id=373 bgcolor=#E9E9E9
| 139373 ||  || — || June 28, 2001 || Anderson Mesa || LONEOS || ADE || align=right | 4.5 km || 
|-id=374 bgcolor=#E9E9E9
| 139374 ||  || — || June 29, 2001 || Anderson Mesa || LONEOS || GEF || align=right | 2.4 km || 
|-id=375 bgcolor=#E9E9E9
| 139375 ||  || — || June 25, 2001 || Palomar || NEAT || — || align=right | 2.0 km || 
|-id=376 bgcolor=#E9E9E9
| 139376 ||  || — || June 25, 2001 || Palomar || NEAT || — || align=right | 3.6 km || 
|-id=377 bgcolor=#E9E9E9
| 139377 ||  || — || June 25, 2001 || Palomar || NEAT || — || align=right | 4.5 km || 
|-id=378 bgcolor=#E9E9E9
| 139378 ||  || — || June 27, 2001 || Palomar || NEAT || — || align=right | 2.8 km || 
|-id=379 bgcolor=#E9E9E9
| 139379 ||  || — || June 30, 2001 || Palomar || NEAT || — || align=right | 1.6 km || 
|-id=380 bgcolor=#E9E9E9
| 139380 ||  || — || June 27, 2001 || Haleakala || NEAT || — || align=right | 3.1 km || 
|-id=381 bgcolor=#E9E9E9
| 139381 ||  || — || June 27, 2001 || Haleakala || NEAT || EUN || align=right | 1.9 km || 
|-id=382 bgcolor=#fefefe
| 139382 ||  || — || June 19, 2001 || Haleakala || NEAT || — || align=right | 1.5 km || 
|-id=383 bgcolor=#E9E9E9
| 139383 ||  || — || June 20, 2001 || Anderson Mesa || LONEOS || GER || align=right | 2.8 km || 
|-id=384 bgcolor=#E9E9E9
| 139384 ||  || — || June 20, 2001 || Haleakala || NEAT || INO || align=right | 2.0 km || 
|-id=385 bgcolor=#d6d6d6
| 139385 ||  || — || June 27, 2001 || Anderson Mesa || LONEOS || HYG || align=right | 5.7 km || 
|-id=386 bgcolor=#E9E9E9
| 139386 ||  || — || July 10, 2001 || Palomar || NEAT || — || align=right | 2.1 km || 
|-id=387 bgcolor=#E9E9E9
| 139387 ||  || — || July 13, 2001 || Palomar || NEAT || — || align=right | 4.0 km || 
|-id=388 bgcolor=#E9E9E9
| 139388 ||  || — || July 13, 2001 || Palomar || NEAT || — || align=right | 2.0 km || 
|-id=389 bgcolor=#E9E9E9
| 139389 ||  || — || July 13, 2001 || Palomar || NEAT || — || align=right | 3.5 km || 
|-id=390 bgcolor=#E9E9E9
| 139390 ||  || — || July 13, 2001 || Palomar || NEAT || MAR || align=right | 2.2 km || 
|-id=391 bgcolor=#E9E9E9
| 139391 ||  || — || July 13, 2001 || Palomar || NEAT || — || align=right | 2.1 km || 
|-id=392 bgcolor=#E9E9E9
| 139392 ||  || — || July 14, 2001 || Palomar || NEAT || — || align=right | 2.2 km || 
|-id=393 bgcolor=#E9E9E9
| 139393 ||  || — || July 14, 2001 || Haleakala || NEAT || — || align=right | 1.7 km || 
|-id=394 bgcolor=#E9E9E9
| 139394 ||  || — || July 14, 2001 || Palomar || NEAT || WIT || align=right | 2.1 km || 
|-id=395 bgcolor=#E9E9E9
| 139395 ||  || — || July 14, 2001 || Palomar || NEAT || — || align=right | 4.0 km || 
|-id=396 bgcolor=#E9E9E9
| 139396 ||  || — || July 14, 2001 || Palomar || NEAT || — || align=right | 4.3 km || 
|-id=397 bgcolor=#E9E9E9
| 139397 ||  || — || July 14, 2001 || Haleakala || NEAT || — || align=right | 4.1 km || 
|-id=398 bgcolor=#E9E9E9
| 139398 ||  || — || July 10, 2001 || Socorro || LINEAR || JUN || align=right | 2.1 km || 
|-id=399 bgcolor=#E9E9E9
| 139399 ||  || — || July 14, 2001 || Palomar || NEAT || — || align=right | 3.9 km || 
|-id=400 bgcolor=#E9E9E9
| 139400 ||  || — || July 13, 2001 || Palomar || NEAT || — || align=right | 3.7 km || 
|}

139401–139500 

|-bgcolor=#E9E9E9
| 139401 ||  || — || July 14, 2001 || Palomar || NEAT || MAR || align=right | 2.1 km || 
|-id=402 bgcolor=#E9E9E9
| 139402 ||  || — || July 14, 2001 || Palomar || NEAT || — || align=right | 3.9 km || 
|-id=403 bgcolor=#E9E9E9
| 139403 ||  || — || July 18, 2001 || Palomar || NEAT || — || align=right | 3.8 km || 
|-id=404 bgcolor=#E9E9E9
| 139404 ||  || — || July 16, 2001 || Anderson Mesa || LONEOS || EUN || align=right | 2.3 km || 
|-id=405 bgcolor=#E9E9E9
| 139405 ||  || — || July 16, 2001 || Anderson Mesa || LONEOS || ADE || align=right | 4.6 km || 
|-id=406 bgcolor=#E9E9E9
| 139406 ||  || — || July 18, 2001 || Palomar || NEAT || — || align=right | 3.8 km || 
|-id=407 bgcolor=#E9E9E9
| 139407 ||  || — || July 18, 2001 || Palomar || NEAT || MAR || align=right | 2.3 km || 
|-id=408 bgcolor=#E9E9E9
| 139408 ||  || — || July 18, 2001 || Haleakala || NEAT || — || align=right | 4.3 km || 
|-id=409 bgcolor=#E9E9E9
| 139409 ||  || — || July 21, 2001 || Reedy Creek || J. Broughton || INO || align=right | 3.3 km || 
|-id=410 bgcolor=#E9E9E9
| 139410 ||  || — || July 20, 2001 || Socorro || LINEAR || — || align=right | 2.9 km || 
|-id=411 bgcolor=#fefefe
| 139411 ||  || — || July 18, 2001 || Palomar || NEAT || V || align=right | 1.4 km || 
|-id=412 bgcolor=#E9E9E9
| 139412 ||  || — || July 18, 2001 || Palomar || NEAT || — || align=right | 4.1 km || 
|-id=413 bgcolor=#E9E9E9
| 139413 ||  || — || July 21, 2001 || Palomar || NEAT || — || align=right | 4.1 km || 
|-id=414 bgcolor=#E9E9E9
| 139414 ||  || — || July 20, 2001 || San Marcello || A. Boattini, M. Tombelli || GEF || align=right | 2.0 km || 
|-id=415 bgcolor=#E9E9E9
| 139415 ||  || — || July 17, 2001 || Haleakala || NEAT || — || align=right | 2.7 km || 
|-id=416 bgcolor=#E9E9E9
| 139416 ||  || — || July 17, 2001 || Haleakala || NEAT || — || align=right | 3.7 km || 
|-id=417 bgcolor=#E9E9E9
| 139417 ||  || — || July 17, 2001 || Haleakala || NEAT || — || align=right | 1.4 km || 
|-id=418 bgcolor=#E9E9E9
| 139418 ||  || — || July 21, 2001 || Anderson Mesa || LONEOS || — || align=right | 3.5 km || 
|-id=419 bgcolor=#E9E9E9
| 139419 ||  || — || July 21, 2001 || Anderson Mesa || LONEOS || — || align=right | 2.4 km || 
|-id=420 bgcolor=#E9E9E9
| 139420 ||  || — || July 17, 2001 || Palomar || NEAT || MAR || align=right | 2.1 km || 
|-id=421 bgcolor=#E9E9E9
| 139421 ||  || — || July 18, 2001 || Palomar || NEAT || — || align=right | 2.2 km || 
|-id=422 bgcolor=#E9E9E9
| 139422 ||  || — || July 18, 2001 || Palomar || NEAT || — || align=right | 1.9 km || 
|-id=423 bgcolor=#E9E9E9
| 139423 ||  || — || July 19, 2001 || Palomar || NEAT || — || align=right | 2.6 km || 
|-id=424 bgcolor=#E9E9E9
| 139424 ||  || — || July 19, 2001 || Palomar || NEAT || — || align=right | 3.0 km || 
|-id=425 bgcolor=#E9E9E9
| 139425 ||  || — || July 19, 2001 || Palomar || NEAT || — || align=right | 1.6 km || 
|-id=426 bgcolor=#E9E9E9
| 139426 ||  || — || July 19, 2001 || Palomar || NEAT || MAR || align=right | 2.4 km || 
|-id=427 bgcolor=#E9E9E9
| 139427 ||  || — || July 21, 2001 || Haleakala || NEAT || — || align=right | 2.1 km || 
|-id=428 bgcolor=#E9E9E9
| 139428 ||  || — || July 20, 2001 || Palomar || NEAT || MIT || align=right | 5.5 km || 
|-id=429 bgcolor=#E9E9E9
| 139429 ||  || — || July 20, 2001 || Palomar || NEAT || — || align=right | 4.0 km || 
|-id=430 bgcolor=#E9E9E9
| 139430 ||  || — || July 16, 2001 || Anderson Mesa || LONEOS || — || align=right | 2.7 km || 
|-id=431 bgcolor=#E9E9E9
| 139431 ||  || — || July 16, 2001 || Anderson Mesa || LONEOS || WAT || align=right | 2.8 km || 
|-id=432 bgcolor=#E9E9E9
| 139432 ||  || — || July 16, 2001 || Anderson Mesa || LONEOS || — || align=right | 3.6 km || 
|-id=433 bgcolor=#E9E9E9
| 139433 ||  || — || July 16, 2001 || Anderson Mesa || LONEOS || — || align=right | 3.1 km || 
|-id=434 bgcolor=#E9E9E9
| 139434 ||  || — || July 16, 2001 || Haleakala || NEAT || MAR || align=right | 2.7 km || 
|-id=435 bgcolor=#E9E9E9
| 139435 ||  || — || July 21, 2001 || Palomar || NEAT || — || align=right | 2.9 km || 
|-id=436 bgcolor=#E9E9E9
| 139436 ||  || — || July 21, 2001 || Palomar || NEAT || — || align=right | 5.0 km || 
|-id=437 bgcolor=#E9E9E9
| 139437 ||  || — || July 21, 2001 || Palomar || NEAT || EUN || align=right | 2.3 km || 
|-id=438 bgcolor=#E9E9E9
| 139438 ||  || — || July 21, 2001 || Palomar || NEAT || — || align=right | 4.8 km || 
|-id=439 bgcolor=#E9E9E9
| 139439 ||  || — || July 21, 2001 || Palomar || NEAT || — || align=right | 4.6 km || 
|-id=440 bgcolor=#E9E9E9
| 139440 ||  || — || July 22, 2001 || Palomar || NEAT || — || align=right | 4.7 km || 
|-id=441 bgcolor=#E9E9E9
| 139441 ||  || — || July 16, 2001 || Anderson Mesa || LONEOS || — || align=right | 5.2 km || 
|-id=442 bgcolor=#E9E9E9
| 139442 ||  || — || July 21, 2001 || Haleakala || NEAT || — || align=right | 1.7 km || 
|-id=443 bgcolor=#E9E9E9
| 139443 ||  || — || July 21, 2001 || Haleakala || NEAT || MAR || align=right | 2.9 km || 
|-id=444 bgcolor=#E9E9E9
| 139444 ||  || — || July 21, 2001 || Haleakala || NEAT || WIT || align=right | 2.4 km || 
|-id=445 bgcolor=#E9E9E9
| 139445 ||  || — || July 26, 2001 || Desert Beaver || W. K. Y. Yeung || — || align=right | 4.2 km || 
|-id=446 bgcolor=#E9E9E9
| 139446 ||  || — || July 23, 2001 || Haleakala || NEAT || JUN || align=right | 2.6 km || 
|-id=447 bgcolor=#E9E9E9
| 139447 ||  || — || July 23, 2001 || Haleakala || NEAT || — || align=right | 3.1 km || 
|-id=448 bgcolor=#E9E9E9
| 139448 ||  || — || July 24, 2001 || Haleakala || NEAT || EUN || align=right | 1.7 km || 
|-id=449 bgcolor=#E9E9E9
| 139449 ||  || — || July 18, 2001 || Palomar || NEAT || — || align=right | 1.7 km || 
|-id=450 bgcolor=#E9E9E9
| 139450 ||  || — || July 22, 2001 || Palomar || NEAT || — || align=right | 3.2 km || 
|-id=451 bgcolor=#E9E9E9
| 139451 ||  || — || July 22, 2001 || Palomar || NEAT || MAR || align=right | 2.3 km || 
|-id=452 bgcolor=#d6d6d6
| 139452 ||  || — || July 22, 2001 || Palomar || NEAT || EMA || align=right | 5.3 km || 
|-id=453 bgcolor=#E9E9E9
| 139453 ||  || — || July 16, 2001 || Anderson Mesa || LONEOS || — || align=right | 2.6 km || 
|-id=454 bgcolor=#E9E9E9
| 139454 ||  || — || July 18, 2001 || Palomar || NEAT || — || align=right | 2.8 km || 
|-id=455 bgcolor=#E9E9E9
| 139455 ||  || — || July 20, 2001 || Palomar || NEAT || — || align=right | 4.7 km || 
|-id=456 bgcolor=#fefefe
| 139456 ||  || — || July 21, 2001 || Haleakala || NEAT || — || align=right | 1.5 km || 
|-id=457 bgcolor=#d6d6d6
| 139457 ||  || — || July 19, 2001 || Anderson Mesa || LONEOS || EOS || align=right | 3.4 km || 
|-id=458 bgcolor=#d6d6d6
| 139458 ||  || — || July 29, 2001 || Socorro || LINEAR || — || align=right | 8.9 km || 
|-id=459 bgcolor=#E9E9E9
| 139459 ||  || — || July 29, 2001 || Socorro || LINEAR || — || align=right | 2.7 km || 
|-id=460 bgcolor=#E9E9E9
| 139460 ||  || — || July 26, 2001 || Palomar || NEAT || — || align=right | 4.2 km || 
|-id=461 bgcolor=#E9E9E9
| 139461 ||  || — || July 29, 2001 || Palomar || NEAT || — || align=right | 5.5 km || 
|-id=462 bgcolor=#E9E9E9
| 139462 ||  || — || July 22, 2001 || Siding Spring || R. H. McNaught || TIN || align=right | 3.8 km || 
|-id=463 bgcolor=#E9E9E9
| 139463 ||  || — || July 20, 2001 || Anderson Mesa || LONEOS || — || align=right | 4.3 km || 
|-id=464 bgcolor=#E9E9E9
| 139464 ||  || — || July 22, 2001 || Anderson Mesa || LONEOS || — || align=right | 4.4 km || 
|-id=465 bgcolor=#E9E9E9
| 139465 ||  || — || July 21, 2001 || Haleakala || NEAT || XIZ || align=right | 2.4 km || 
|-id=466 bgcolor=#d6d6d6
| 139466 ||  || — || July 21, 2001 || Haleakala || NEAT || — || align=right | 8.5 km || 
|-id=467 bgcolor=#E9E9E9
| 139467 ||  || — || July 25, 2001 || Haleakala || NEAT || — || align=right | 4.1 km || 
|-id=468 bgcolor=#E9E9E9
| 139468 ||  || — || July 25, 2001 || Haleakala || NEAT || — || align=right | 1.6 km || 
|-id=469 bgcolor=#E9E9E9
| 139469 ||  || — || July 19, 2001 || OCA-Anza || M. White, M. Collins || — || align=right | 2.1 km || 
|-id=470 bgcolor=#d6d6d6
| 139470 ||  || — || July 30, 2001 || Palomar || NEAT || FIR || align=right | 5.7 km || 
|-id=471 bgcolor=#E9E9E9
| 139471 ||  || — || July 31, 2001 || Palomar || NEAT || MAR || align=right | 2.2 km || 
|-id=472 bgcolor=#d6d6d6
| 139472 ||  || — || July 24, 2001 || Palomar || NEAT || — || align=right | 3.4 km || 
|-id=473 bgcolor=#fefefe
| 139473 ||  || — || July 27, 2001 || Anderson Mesa || LONEOS || — || align=right | 1.5 km || 
|-id=474 bgcolor=#E9E9E9
| 139474 ||  || — || July 27, 2001 || Anderson Mesa || LONEOS || — || align=right | 2.6 km || 
|-id=475 bgcolor=#E9E9E9
| 139475 ||  || — || July 28, 2001 || Haleakala || NEAT || GEF || align=right | 3.0 km || 
|-id=476 bgcolor=#E9E9E9
| 139476 ||  || — || July 30, 2001 || Socorro || LINEAR || EUN || align=right | 2.4 km || 
|-id=477 bgcolor=#E9E9E9
| 139477 ||  || — || July 30, 2001 || Socorro || LINEAR || — || align=right | 3.4 km || 
|-id=478 bgcolor=#d6d6d6
| 139478 ||  || — || July 19, 2001 || Mauna Kea || D. J. Tholen || TIR || align=right | 4.3 km || 
|-id=479 bgcolor=#E9E9E9
| 139479 ||  || — || July 29, 2001 || Socorro || LINEAR || — || align=right | 2.3 km || 
|-id=480 bgcolor=#E9E9E9
| 139480 ||  || — || August 8, 2001 || Haleakala || NEAT || — || align=right | 2.7 km || 
|-id=481 bgcolor=#E9E9E9
| 139481 ||  || — || August 3, 2001 || Haleakala || NEAT || CLO || align=right | 3.0 km || 
|-id=482 bgcolor=#E9E9E9
| 139482 ||  || — || August 7, 2001 || Haleakala || NEAT || PAE || align=right | 5.4 km || 
|-id=483 bgcolor=#d6d6d6
| 139483 ||  || — || August 11, 2001 || Haleakala || NEAT || — || align=right | 4.9 km || 
|-id=484 bgcolor=#E9E9E9
| 139484 ||  || — || August 8, 2001 || Haleakala || NEAT || — || align=right | 1.7 km || 
|-id=485 bgcolor=#E9E9E9
| 139485 ||  || — || August 14, 2001 || Ondřejov || P. Kušnirák || — || align=right | 4.6 km || 
|-id=486 bgcolor=#E9E9E9
| 139486 ||  || — || August 9, 2001 || Palomar || NEAT || — || align=right | 1.7 km || 
|-id=487 bgcolor=#d6d6d6
| 139487 ||  || — || August 10, 2001 || Palomar || NEAT || BRA || align=right | 3.4 km || 
|-id=488 bgcolor=#E9E9E9
| 139488 ||  || — || August 10, 2001 || Haleakala || NEAT || — || align=right | 1.9 km || 
|-id=489 bgcolor=#E9E9E9
| 139489 ||  || — || August 11, 2001 || Haleakala || NEAT || — || align=right | 4.9 km || 
|-id=490 bgcolor=#E9E9E9
| 139490 ||  || — || August 11, 2001 || Haleakala || NEAT || — || align=right | 4.2 km || 
|-id=491 bgcolor=#E9E9E9
| 139491 ||  || — || August 11, 2001 || Haleakala || NEAT || — || align=right | 4.2 km || 
|-id=492 bgcolor=#d6d6d6
| 139492 ||  || — || August 11, 2001 || Haleakala || NEAT || — || align=right | 5.4 km || 
|-id=493 bgcolor=#E9E9E9
| 139493 ||  || — || August 14, 2001 || Haleakala || NEAT || — || align=right | 1.8 km || 
|-id=494 bgcolor=#E9E9E9
| 139494 ||  || — || August 10, 2001 || Palomar || NEAT || fast? || align=right | 2.5 km || 
|-id=495 bgcolor=#E9E9E9
| 139495 ||  || — || August 10, 2001 || Palomar || NEAT || — || align=right | 2.1 km || 
|-id=496 bgcolor=#E9E9E9
| 139496 ||  || — || August 10, 2001 || Palomar || NEAT || — || align=right | 3.1 km || 
|-id=497 bgcolor=#E9E9E9
| 139497 ||  || — || August 10, 2001 || Haleakala || NEAT || — || align=right | 5.1 km || 
|-id=498 bgcolor=#E9E9E9
| 139498 ||  || — || August 10, 2001 || Palomar || NEAT || — || align=right | 6.8 km || 
|-id=499 bgcolor=#E9E9E9
| 139499 ||  || — || August 11, 2001 || Palomar || NEAT || IAN || align=right | 2.0 km || 
|-id=500 bgcolor=#E9E9E9
| 139500 ||  || — || August 11, 2001 || Palomar || NEAT || EUN || align=right | 2.6 km || 
|}

139501–139600 

|-bgcolor=#E9E9E9
| 139501 ||  || — || August 11, 2001 || Palomar || NEAT || — || align=right | 4.7 km || 
|-id=502 bgcolor=#E9E9E9
| 139502 ||  || — || August 11, 2001 || Palomar || NEAT || — || align=right | 2.8 km || 
|-id=503 bgcolor=#E9E9E9
| 139503 ||  || — || August 11, 2001 || Palomar || NEAT || — || align=right | 4.4 km || 
|-id=504 bgcolor=#E9E9E9
| 139504 ||  || — || August 11, 2001 || Palomar || NEAT || — || align=right | 4.0 km || 
|-id=505 bgcolor=#d6d6d6
| 139505 ||  || — || August 11, 2001 || Palomar || NEAT || EOS || align=right | 4.1 km || 
|-id=506 bgcolor=#E9E9E9
| 139506 ||  || — || August 11, 2001 || Palomar || NEAT || EUN || align=right | 2.4 km || 
|-id=507 bgcolor=#E9E9E9
| 139507 ||  || — || August 11, 2001 || Palomar || NEAT || — || align=right | 5.2 km || 
|-id=508 bgcolor=#E9E9E9
| 139508 ||  || — || August 12, 2001 || Palomar || NEAT || — || align=right | 2.4 km || 
|-id=509 bgcolor=#E9E9E9
| 139509 ||  || — || August 13, 2001 || Bergisch Gladbach || W. Bickel || — || align=right | 1.3 km || 
|-id=510 bgcolor=#E9E9E9
| 139510 ||  || — || August 14, 2001 || Bergisch Gladbach || W. Bickel || — || align=right | 2.4 km || 
|-id=511 bgcolor=#E9E9E9
| 139511 ||  || — || August 14, 2001 || Palomar || NEAT || HNS || align=right | 2.6 km || 
|-id=512 bgcolor=#E9E9E9
| 139512 ||  || — || August 15, 2001 || Haleakala || NEAT || — || align=right | 2.5 km || 
|-id=513 bgcolor=#E9E9E9
| 139513 ||  || — || August 15, 2001 || Haleakala || NEAT || — || align=right | 2.1 km || 
|-id=514 bgcolor=#E9E9E9
| 139514 ||  || — || August 15, 2001 || Haleakala || NEAT || — || align=right | 3.8 km || 
|-id=515 bgcolor=#E9E9E9
| 139515 ||  || — || August 14, 2001 || Haleakala || NEAT || NEM || align=right | 4.3 km || 
|-id=516 bgcolor=#E9E9E9
| 139516 ||  || — || August 14, 2001 || Haleakala || NEAT || — || align=right | 2.8 km || 
|-id=517 bgcolor=#d6d6d6
| 139517 ||  || — || August 14, 2001 || Haleakala || NEAT || FIR || align=right | 7.3 km || 
|-id=518 bgcolor=#E9E9E9
| 139518 ||  || — || August 14, 2001 || Haleakala || NEAT || — || align=right | 4.8 km || 
|-id=519 bgcolor=#E9E9E9
| 139519 ||  || — || August 13, 2001 || Haleakala || NEAT || NEM || align=right | 4.5 km || 
|-id=520 bgcolor=#E9E9E9
| 139520 ||  || — || August 13, 2001 || Haleakala || NEAT || — || align=right | 3.8 km || 
|-id=521 bgcolor=#E9E9E9
| 139521 ||  || — || August 3, 2001 || Palomar || NEAT || — || align=right | 5.2 km || 
|-id=522 bgcolor=#E9E9E9
| 139522 ||  || — || August 16, 2001 || Socorro || LINEAR || — || align=right | 4.7 km || 
|-id=523 bgcolor=#E9E9E9
| 139523 ||  || — || August 17, 2001 || Reedy Creek || J. Broughton || GEF || align=right | 2.9 km || 
|-id=524 bgcolor=#E9E9E9
| 139524 ||  || — || August 17, 2001 || Reedy Creek || J. Broughton || — || align=right | 4.4 km || 
|-id=525 bgcolor=#E9E9E9
| 139525 ||  || — || August 16, 2001 || Socorro || LINEAR || — || align=right | 3.6 km || 
|-id=526 bgcolor=#E9E9E9
| 139526 ||  || — || August 16, 2001 || Socorro || LINEAR || INO || align=right | 2.0 km || 
|-id=527 bgcolor=#d6d6d6
| 139527 ||  || — || August 16, 2001 || Socorro || LINEAR || — || align=right | 2.9 km || 
|-id=528 bgcolor=#E9E9E9
| 139528 ||  || — || August 16, 2001 || Socorro || LINEAR || DOR || align=right | 4.5 km || 
|-id=529 bgcolor=#E9E9E9
| 139529 ||  || — || August 16, 2001 || Socorro || LINEAR || — || align=right | 3.1 km || 
|-id=530 bgcolor=#E9E9E9
| 139530 ||  || — || August 16, 2001 || Socorro || LINEAR || — || align=right | 2.8 km || 
|-id=531 bgcolor=#E9E9E9
| 139531 ||  || — || August 16, 2001 || Socorro || LINEAR || — || align=right | 5.1 km || 
|-id=532 bgcolor=#E9E9E9
| 139532 ||  || — || August 16, 2001 || Socorro || LINEAR || HNA || align=right | 3.8 km || 
|-id=533 bgcolor=#d6d6d6
| 139533 ||  || — || August 16, 2001 || Socorro || LINEAR || — || align=right | 5.9 km || 
|-id=534 bgcolor=#E9E9E9
| 139534 ||  || — || August 16, 2001 || Socorro || LINEAR || — || align=right | 1.9 km || 
|-id=535 bgcolor=#d6d6d6
| 139535 ||  || — || August 16, 2001 || Socorro || LINEAR || BRA || align=right | 3.2 km || 
|-id=536 bgcolor=#d6d6d6
| 139536 ||  || — || August 16, 2001 || Socorro || LINEAR || — || align=right | 4.8 km || 
|-id=537 bgcolor=#E9E9E9
| 139537 ||  || — || August 16, 2001 || Socorro || LINEAR || — || align=right | 5.1 km || 
|-id=538 bgcolor=#E9E9E9
| 139538 ||  || — || August 16, 2001 || Socorro || LINEAR || NEM || align=right | 4.7 km || 
|-id=539 bgcolor=#E9E9E9
| 139539 ||  || — || August 16, 2001 || Socorro || LINEAR || — || align=right | 4.0 km || 
|-id=540 bgcolor=#E9E9E9
| 139540 ||  || — || August 16, 2001 || Socorro || LINEAR || PAE || align=right | 5.0 km || 
|-id=541 bgcolor=#E9E9E9
| 139541 ||  || — || August 16, 2001 || Socorro || LINEAR || MAR || align=right | 2.5 km || 
|-id=542 bgcolor=#E9E9E9
| 139542 ||  || — || August 16, 2001 || Socorro || LINEAR || — || align=right | 3.4 km || 
|-id=543 bgcolor=#fefefe
| 139543 ||  || — || August 16, 2001 || Socorro || LINEAR || — || align=right | 1.3 km || 
|-id=544 bgcolor=#E9E9E9
| 139544 ||  || — || August 16, 2001 || Socorro || LINEAR || WIT || align=right | 1.8 km || 
|-id=545 bgcolor=#E9E9E9
| 139545 ||  || — || August 16, 2001 || Socorro || LINEAR || HEN || align=right | 1.9 km || 
|-id=546 bgcolor=#E9E9E9
| 139546 ||  || — || August 16, 2001 || Socorro || LINEAR || INO || align=right | 2.7 km || 
|-id=547 bgcolor=#E9E9E9
| 139547 ||  || — || August 16, 2001 || Socorro || LINEAR || VIB || align=right | 5.2 km || 
|-id=548 bgcolor=#d6d6d6
| 139548 ||  || — || August 16, 2001 || Socorro || LINEAR || — || align=right | 4.2 km || 
|-id=549 bgcolor=#d6d6d6
| 139549 ||  || — || August 16, 2001 || Socorro || LINEAR || — || align=right | 5.1 km || 
|-id=550 bgcolor=#E9E9E9
| 139550 ||  || — || August 16, 2001 || Socorro || LINEAR || — || align=right | 5.0 km || 
|-id=551 bgcolor=#E9E9E9
| 139551 ||  || — || August 16, 2001 || Socorro || LINEAR || HEN || align=right | 2.3 km || 
|-id=552 bgcolor=#d6d6d6
| 139552 ||  || — || August 16, 2001 || Socorro || LINEAR || — || align=right | 5.9 km || 
|-id=553 bgcolor=#E9E9E9
| 139553 ||  || — || August 17, 2001 || Socorro || LINEAR || WIT || align=right | 2.0 km || 
|-id=554 bgcolor=#E9E9E9
| 139554 ||  || — || August 18, 2001 || Socorro || LINEAR || — || align=right | 2.1 km || 
|-id=555 bgcolor=#fefefe
| 139555 ||  || — || August 19, 2001 || Socorro || LINEAR || — || align=right | 2.7 km || 
|-id=556 bgcolor=#E9E9E9
| 139556 ||  || — || August 19, 2001 || Socorro || LINEAR || GEF || align=right | 2.4 km || 
|-id=557 bgcolor=#E9E9E9
| 139557 ||  || — || August 20, 2001 || Oakley || C. Wolfe || — || align=right | 4.0 km || 
|-id=558 bgcolor=#E9E9E9
| 139558 ||  || — || August 20, 2001 || Oakley || C. Wolfe || — || align=right | 3.9 km || 
|-id=559 bgcolor=#E9E9E9
| 139559 ||  || — || August 17, 2001 || Socorro || LINEAR || — || align=right | 2.0 km || 
|-id=560 bgcolor=#d6d6d6
| 139560 ||  || — || August 16, 2001 || Palomar || NEAT || EUP || align=right | 7.8 km || 
|-id=561 bgcolor=#E9E9E9
| 139561 ||  || — || August 21, 2001 || Desert Eagle || W. K. Y. Yeung || XIZ || align=right | 2.8 km || 
|-id=562 bgcolor=#E9E9E9
| 139562 ||  || — || August 16, 2001 || Socorro || LINEAR || DOR || align=right | 5.6 km || 
|-id=563 bgcolor=#E9E9E9
| 139563 ||  || — || August 16, 2001 || Socorro || LINEAR || — || align=right | 2.7 km || 
|-id=564 bgcolor=#d6d6d6
| 139564 ||  || — || August 16, 2001 || Socorro || LINEAR || — || align=right | 10 km || 
|-id=565 bgcolor=#d6d6d6
| 139565 ||  || — || August 16, 2001 || Socorro || LINEAR || — || align=right | 5.8 km || 
|-id=566 bgcolor=#d6d6d6
| 139566 ||  || — || August 16, 2001 || Socorro || LINEAR || — || align=right | 6.9 km || 
|-id=567 bgcolor=#d6d6d6
| 139567 ||  || — || August 16, 2001 || Socorro || LINEAR || TIR || align=right | 5.9 km || 
|-id=568 bgcolor=#d6d6d6
| 139568 ||  || — || August 17, 2001 || Socorro || LINEAR || EOS || align=right | 4.5 km || 
|-id=569 bgcolor=#E9E9E9
| 139569 ||  || — || August 19, 2001 || Socorro || LINEAR || — || align=right | 1.9 km || 
|-id=570 bgcolor=#d6d6d6
| 139570 ||  || — || August 17, 2001 || Palomar || NEAT || — || align=right | 5.6 km || 
|-id=571 bgcolor=#E9E9E9
| 139571 ||  || — || August 21, 2001 || Kitt Peak || Spacewatch || — || align=right | 4.5 km || 
|-id=572 bgcolor=#d6d6d6
| 139572 ||  || — || August 16, 2001 || Palomar || NEAT || ALA || align=right | 7.4 km || 
|-id=573 bgcolor=#d6d6d6
| 139573 ||  || — || August 18, 2001 || Palomar || NEAT || TIR || align=right | 5.2 km || 
|-id=574 bgcolor=#d6d6d6
| 139574 ||  || — || August 19, 2001 || Socorro || LINEAR || — || align=right | 6.0 km || 
|-id=575 bgcolor=#E9E9E9
| 139575 ||  || — || August 19, 2001 || Socorro || LINEAR || — || align=right | 4.0 km || 
|-id=576 bgcolor=#E9E9E9
| 139576 ||  || — || August 19, 2001 || Socorro || LINEAR || — || align=right | 1.5 km || 
|-id=577 bgcolor=#d6d6d6
| 139577 ||  || — || August 22, 2001 || Socorro || LINEAR || MEL || align=right | 7.5 km || 
|-id=578 bgcolor=#d6d6d6
| 139578 ||  || — || August 23, 2001 || Desert Eagle || W. K. Y. Yeung || KAR || align=right | 2.2 km || 
|-id=579 bgcolor=#d6d6d6
| 139579 ||  || — || August 23, 2001 || Kitt Peak || Spacewatch || KOR || align=right | 2.1 km || 
|-id=580 bgcolor=#E9E9E9
| 139580 ||  || — || August 17, 2001 || Socorro || LINEAR || MRX || align=right | 2.3 km || 
|-id=581 bgcolor=#E9E9E9
| 139581 ||  || — || August 19, 2001 || Socorro || LINEAR || GEF || align=right | 2.2 km || 
|-id=582 bgcolor=#d6d6d6
| 139582 ||  || — || August 22, 2001 || Socorro || LINEAR || — || align=right | 7.3 km || 
|-id=583 bgcolor=#E9E9E9
| 139583 ||  || — || August 23, 2001 || Socorro || LINEAR || — || align=right | 2.5 km || 
|-id=584 bgcolor=#E9E9E9
| 139584 ||  || — || August 18, 2001 || Anderson Mesa || LONEOS || — || align=right | 2.5 km || 
|-id=585 bgcolor=#E9E9E9
| 139585 ||  || — || August 21, 2001 || Haleakala || NEAT || — || align=right | 3.7 km || 
|-id=586 bgcolor=#E9E9E9
| 139586 ||  || — || August 24, 2001 || Ondřejov || P. Pravec, P. Kušnirák || — || align=right | 2.2 km || 
|-id=587 bgcolor=#fefefe
| 139587 ||  || — || August 22, 2001 || Socorro || LINEAR || H || align=right data-sort-value="0.93" | 930 m || 
|-id=588 bgcolor=#fefefe
| 139588 ||  || — || August 22, 2001 || Socorro || LINEAR || V || align=right | 1.4 km || 
|-id=589 bgcolor=#E9E9E9
| 139589 ||  || — || August 22, 2001 || Socorro || LINEAR || ADE || align=right | 3.7 km || 
|-id=590 bgcolor=#d6d6d6
| 139590 ||  || — || August 25, 2001 || Socorro || LINEAR || EOS || align=right | 5.1 km || 
|-id=591 bgcolor=#E9E9E9
| 139591 ||  || — || August 25, 2001 || Ondřejov || P. Pravec, P. Kušnirák || GEF || align=right | 1.8 km || 
|-id=592 bgcolor=#E9E9E9
| 139592 ||  || — || August 17, 2001 || Socorro || LINEAR || — || align=right | 3.6 km || 
|-id=593 bgcolor=#d6d6d6
| 139593 ||  || — || August 17, 2001 || Socorro || LINEAR || — || align=right | 7.2 km || 
|-id=594 bgcolor=#d6d6d6
| 139594 ||  || — || August 17, 2001 || Socorro || LINEAR || EOS || align=right | 3.1 km || 
|-id=595 bgcolor=#E9E9E9
| 139595 ||  || — || August 17, 2001 || Socorro || LINEAR || — || align=right | 4.9 km || 
|-id=596 bgcolor=#E9E9E9
| 139596 ||  || — || August 17, 2001 || Socorro || LINEAR || PAE || align=right | 4.3 km || 
|-id=597 bgcolor=#d6d6d6
| 139597 ||  || — || August 17, 2001 || Socorro || LINEAR || — || align=right | 5.9 km || 
|-id=598 bgcolor=#E9E9E9
| 139598 ||  || — || August 19, 2001 || Socorro || LINEAR || ADE || align=right | 5.5 km || 
|-id=599 bgcolor=#E9E9E9
| 139599 ||  || — || August 19, 2001 || Socorro || LINEAR || — || align=right | 5.4 km || 
|-id=600 bgcolor=#E9E9E9
| 139600 ||  || — || August 19, 2001 || Socorro || LINEAR || GAL || align=right | 2.5 km || 
|}

139601–139700 

|-bgcolor=#E9E9E9
| 139601 ||  || — || August 19, 2001 || Socorro || LINEAR || MRX || align=right | 2.1 km || 
|-id=602 bgcolor=#d6d6d6
| 139602 ||  || — || August 19, 2001 || Socorro || LINEAR || — || align=right | 6.7 km || 
|-id=603 bgcolor=#E9E9E9
| 139603 ||  || — || August 19, 2001 || Socorro || LINEAR || AGN || align=right | 2.4 km || 
|-id=604 bgcolor=#E9E9E9
| 139604 ||  || — || August 20, 2001 || Socorro || LINEAR || — || align=right | 3.9 km || 
|-id=605 bgcolor=#E9E9E9
| 139605 ||  || — || August 20, 2001 || Socorro || LINEAR || — || align=right | 4.4 km || 
|-id=606 bgcolor=#E9E9E9
| 139606 ||  || — || August 20, 2001 || Socorro || LINEAR || — || align=right | 1.7 km || 
|-id=607 bgcolor=#E9E9E9
| 139607 ||  || — || August 20, 2001 || Socorro || LINEAR || GEF || align=right | 2.0 km || 
|-id=608 bgcolor=#E9E9E9
| 139608 ||  || — || August 20, 2001 || Socorro || LINEAR || — || align=right | 4.2 km || 
|-id=609 bgcolor=#E9E9E9
| 139609 ||  || — || August 20, 2001 || Socorro || LINEAR || — || align=right | 4.3 km || 
|-id=610 bgcolor=#d6d6d6
| 139610 ||  || — || August 20, 2001 || Socorro || LINEAR || — || align=right | 7.0 km || 
|-id=611 bgcolor=#E9E9E9
| 139611 ||  || — || August 21, 2001 || Socorro || LINEAR || — || align=right | 2.8 km || 
|-id=612 bgcolor=#E9E9E9
| 139612 ||  || — || August 22, 2001 || Socorro || LINEAR || — || align=right | 4.6 km || 
|-id=613 bgcolor=#E9E9E9
| 139613 ||  || — || August 22, 2001 || Socorro || LINEAR || — || align=right | 3.7 km || 
|-id=614 bgcolor=#d6d6d6
| 139614 ||  || — || August 22, 2001 || Socorro || LINEAR || EOS || align=right | 3.9 km || 
|-id=615 bgcolor=#d6d6d6
| 139615 ||  || — || August 22, 2001 || Socorro || LINEAR || EOS || align=right | 5.3 km || 
|-id=616 bgcolor=#E9E9E9
| 139616 ||  || — || August 22, 2001 || Socorro || LINEAR || — || align=right | 2.5 km || 
|-id=617 bgcolor=#d6d6d6
| 139617 ||  || — || August 22, 2001 || Socorro || LINEAR || — || align=right | 6.3 km || 
|-id=618 bgcolor=#E9E9E9
| 139618 ||  || — || August 22, 2001 || Socorro || LINEAR || — || align=right | 5.6 km || 
|-id=619 bgcolor=#d6d6d6
| 139619 ||  || — || August 23, 2001 || Socorro || LINEAR || — || align=right | 6.5 km || 
|-id=620 bgcolor=#fefefe
| 139620 ||  || — || August 23, 2001 || Socorro || LINEAR || H || align=right | 1.6 km || 
|-id=621 bgcolor=#E9E9E9
| 139621 ||  || — || August 24, 2001 || Socorro || LINEAR || HOF || align=right | 4.6 km || 
|-id=622 bgcolor=#FFC2E0
| 139622 ||  || — || August 25, 2001 || Haleakala || NEAT || APOPHA || align=right data-sort-value="0.74" | 740 m || 
|-id=623 bgcolor=#d6d6d6
| 139623 ||  || — || August 24, 2001 || Goodricke-Pigott || R. A. Tucker || ALA || align=right | 8.4 km || 
|-id=624 bgcolor=#E9E9E9
| 139624 ||  || — || August 20, 2001 || Palomar || NEAT || — || align=right | 2.5 km || 
|-id=625 bgcolor=#E9E9E9
| 139625 ||  || — || August 21, 2001 || Haleakala || NEAT || HEN || align=right | 2.2 km || 
|-id=626 bgcolor=#E9E9E9
| 139626 ||  || — || August 25, 2001 || Palomar || NEAT || — || align=right | 2.3 km || 
|-id=627 bgcolor=#fefefe
| 139627 ||  || — || August 22, 2001 || Socorro || LINEAR || H || align=right data-sort-value="0.99" | 990 m || 
|-id=628 bgcolor=#E9E9E9
| 139628 ||  || — || August 25, 2001 || Socorro || LINEAR || — || align=right | 1.7 km || 
|-id=629 bgcolor=#E9E9E9
| 139629 ||  || — || August 26, 2001 || Desert Eagle || W. K. Y. Yeung || MRX || align=right | 1.7 km || 
|-id=630 bgcolor=#E9E9E9
| 139630 ||  || — || August 23, 2001 || Anderson Mesa || LONEOS || — || align=right | 2.6 km || 
|-id=631 bgcolor=#E9E9E9
| 139631 ||  || — || August 23, 2001 || Anderson Mesa || LONEOS || — || align=right | 4.7 km || 
|-id=632 bgcolor=#E9E9E9
| 139632 ||  || — || August 23, 2001 || Anderson Mesa || LONEOS || — || align=right | 4.3 km || 
|-id=633 bgcolor=#d6d6d6
| 139633 ||  || — || August 23, 2001 || Anderson Mesa || LONEOS || — || align=right | 4.2 km || 
|-id=634 bgcolor=#d6d6d6
| 139634 ||  || — || August 23, 2001 || Anderson Mesa || LONEOS || — || align=right | 4.3 km || 
|-id=635 bgcolor=#E9E9E9
| 139635 ||  || — || August 23, 2001 || Anderson Mesa || LONEOS || PAD || align=right | 4.1 km || 
|-id=636 bgcolor=#d6d6d6
| 139636 ||  || — || August 23, 2001 || Anderson Mesa || LONEOS || — || align=right | 5.0 km || 
|-id=637 bgcolor=#E9E9E9
| 139637 ||  || — || August 23, 2001 || Anderson Mesa || LONEOS || — || align=right | 4.4 km || 
|-id=638 bgcolor=#E9E9E9
| 139638 ||  || — || August 23, 2001 || Anderson Mesa || LONEOS || — || align=right | 5.7 km || 
|-id=639 bgcolor=#d6d6d6
| 139639 ||  || — || August 23, 2001 || Anderson Mesa || LONEOS || KAR || align=right | 2.2 km || 
|-id=640 bgcolor=#E9E9E9
| 139640 ||  || — || August 23, 2001 || Anderson Mesa || LONEOS || — || align=right | 4.1 km || 
|-id=641 bgcolor=#E9E9E9
| 139641 ||  || — || August 24, 2001 || Haleakala || NEAT || — || align=right | 4.2 km || 
|-id=642 bgcolor=#E9E9E9
| 139642 ||  || — || August 24, 2001 || Haleakala || NEAT || GEF || align=right | 5.4 km || 
|-id=643 bgcolor=#E9E9E9
| 139643 ||  || — || August 24, 2001 || Haleakala || NEAT || — || align=right | 3.8 km || 
|-id=644 bgcolor=#E9E9E9
| 139644 ||  || — || August 26, 2001 || Haleakala || NEAT || — || align=right | 3.0 km || 
|-id=645 bgcolor=#d6d6d6
| 139645 ||  || — || August 23, 2001 || Socorro || LINEAR || — || align=right | 5.3 km || 
|-id=646 bgcolor=#E9E9E9
| 139646 ||  || — || August 24, 2001 || Socorro || LINEAR || — || align=right | 3.5 km || 
|-id=647 bgcolor=#E9E9E9
| 139647 ||  || — || August 25, 2001 || Socorro || LINEAR || — || align=right | 2.3 km || 
|-id=648 bgcolor=#d6d6d6
| 139648 ||  || — || August 25, 2001 || Socorro || LINEAR || — || align=right | 2.8 km || 
|-id=649 bgcolor=#E9E9E9
| 139649 ||  || — || August 27, 2001 || Socorro || LINEAR || — || align=right | 1.9 km || 
|-id=650 bgcolor=#E9E9E9
| 139650 ||  || — || August 23, 2001 || Kitt Peak || Spacewatch || — || align=right | 3.8 km || 
|-id=651 bgcolor=#E9E9E9
| 139651 ||  || — || August 23, 2001 || Kitt Peak || Spacewatch || — || align=right | 3.7 km || 
|-id=652 bgcolor=#E9E9E9
| 139652 ||  || — || August 26, 2001 || Kitt Peak || Spacewatch || PAD || align=right | 2.5 km || 
|-id=653 bgcolor=#E9E9E9
| 139653 ||  || — || August 26, 2001 || Kitt Peak || Spacewatch || XIZ || align=right | 2.1 km || 
|-id=654 bgcolor=#E9E9E9
| 139654 ||  || — || August 25, 2001 || Haleakala || NEAT || — || align=right | 3.8 km || 
|-id=655 bgcolor=#d6d6d6
| 139655 ||  || — || August 22, 2001 || Bergisch Gladbach || W. Bickel || KOR || align=right | 2.0 km || 
|-id=656 bgcolor=#E9E9E9
| 139656 ||  || — || August 21, 2001 || Kitt Peak || Spacewatch || — || align=right | 3.4 km || 
|-id=657 bgcolor=#E9E9E9
| 139657 ||  || — || August 21, 2001 || Kitt Peak || Spacewatch || — || align=right | 2.0 km || 
|-id=658 bgcolor=#E9E9E9
| 139658 ||  || — || August 21, 2001 || Socorro || LINEAR || — || align=right | 2.5 km || 
|-id=659 bgcolor=#E9E9E9
| 139659 ||  || — || August 21, 2001 || Socorro || LINEAR || — || align=right | 4.0 km || 
|-id=660 bgcolor=#E9E9E9
| 139660 ||  || — || August 21, 2001 || Socorro || LINEAR || — || align=right | 4.7 km || 
|-id=661 bgcolor=#E9E9E9
| 139661 ||  || — || August 21, 2001 || Kitt Peak || Spacewatch || WIT || align=right | 1.8 km || 
|-id=662 bgcolor=#E9E9E9
| 139662 ||  || — || August 21, 2001 || Haleakala || NEAT || — || align=right | 2.3 km || 
|-id=663 bgcolor=#E9E9E9
| 139663 ||  || — || August 21, 2001 || Haleakala || NEAT || — || align=right | 2.7 km || 
|-id=664 bgcolor=#E9E9E9
| 139664 ||  || — || August 22, 2001 || Socorro || LINEAR || PAD || align=right | 6.0 km || 
|-id=665 bgcolor=#E9E9E9
| 139665 ||  || — || August 22, 2001 || Socorro || LINEAR || — || align=right | 5.2 km || 
|-id=666 bgcolor=#E9E9E9
| 139666 ||  || — || August 22, 2001 || Socorro || LINEAR || JUN || align=right | 6.7 km || 
|-id=667 bgcolor=#d6d6d6
| 139667 ||  || — || August 22, 2001 || Socorro || LINEAR || — || align=right | 5.7 km || 
|-id=668 bgcolor=#E9E9E9
| 139668 ||  || — || August 22, 2001 || Socorro || LINEAR || — || align=right | 5.8 km || 
|-id=669 bgcolor=#d6d6d6
| 139669 ||  || — || August 22, 2001 || Socorro || LINEAR || — || align=right | 7.7 km || 
|-id=670 bgcolor=#fefefe
| 139670 ||  || — || August 22, 2001 || Kitt Peak || Spacewatch || — || align=right | 1.4 km || 
|-id=671 bgcolor=#fefefe
| 139671 ||  || — || August 22, 2001 || Palomar || NEAT || H || align=right | 1.1 km || 
|-id=672 bgcolor=#E9E9E9
| 139672 ||  || — || August 22, 2001 || Kitt Peak || Spacewatch || — || align=right | 3.6 km || 
|-id=673 bgcolor=#E9E9E9
| 139673 ||  || — || August 23, 2001 || Anderson Mesa || LONEOS || — || align=right | 1.9 km || 
|-id=674 bgcolor=#E9E9E9
| 139674 ||  || — || August 23, 2001 || Anderson Mesa || LONEOS || — || align=right | 3.2 km || 
|-id=675 bgcolor=#E9E9E9
| 139675 ||  || — || August 23, 2001 || Anderson Mesa || LONEOS || — || align=right | 2.0 km || 
|-id=676 bgcolor=#E9E9E9
| 139676 ||  || — || August 23, 2001 || Anderson Mesa || LONEOS || GEF || align=right | 2.5 km || 
|-id=677 bgcolor=#d6d6d6
| 139677 ||  || — || August 23, 2001 || Anderson Mesa || LONEOS || — || align=right | 5.0 km || 
|-id=678 bgcolor=#fefefe
| 139678 ||  || — || August 23, 2001 || Anderson Mesa || LONEOS || — || align=right | 1.6 km || 
|-id=679 bgcolor=#fefefe
| 139679 ||  || — || August 23, 2001 || Anderson Mesa || LONEOS || — || align=right | 1.5 km || 
|-id=680 bgcolor=#d6d6d6
| 139680 ||  || — || August 23, 2001 || Anderson Mesa || LONEOS || — || align=right | 4.3 km || 
|-id=681 bgcolor=#E9E9E9
| 139681 ||  || — || August 23, 2001 || Anderson Mesa || LONEOS || HEN || align=right | 3.1 km || 
|-id=682 bgcolor=#E9E9E9
| 139682 ||  || — || August 23, 2001 || Anderson Mesa || LONEOS || — || align=right | 4.8 km || 
|-id=683 bgcolor=#E9E9E9
| 139683 ||  || — || August 23, 2001 || Anderson Mesa || LONEOS || — || align=right | 3.8 km || 
|-id=684 bgcolor=#E9E9E9
| 139684 ||  || — || August 23, 2001 || Anderson Mesa || LONEOS || MRX || align=right | 2.0 km || 
|-id=685 bgcolor=#E9E9E9
| 139685 ||  || — || August 23, 2001 || Desert Eagle || W. K. Y. Yeung || GEF || align=right | 2.7 km || 
|-id=686 bgcolor=#E9E9E9
| 139686 ||  || — || August 23, 2001 || Anderson Mesa || LONEOS || — || align=right | 2.3 km || 
|-id=687 bgcolor=#E9E9E9
| 139687 ||  || — || August 23, 2001 || Anderson Mesa || LONEOS || — || align=right | 4.8 km || 
|-id=688 bgcolor=#E9E9E9
| 139688 ||  || — || August 23, 2001 || Anderson Mesa || LONEOS || — || align=right | 3.2 km || 
|-id=689 bgcolor=#E9E9E9
| 139689 ||  || — || August 23, 2001 || Anderson Mesa || LONEOS || — || align=right | 1.6 km || 
|-id=690 bgcolor=#E9E9E9
| 139690 ||  || — || August 23, 2001 || Anderson Mesa || LONEOS || — || align=right | 2.2 km || 
|-id=691 bgcolor=#d6d6d6
| 139691 ||  || — || August 23, 2001 || Anderson Mesa || LONEOS || — || align=right | 5.4 km || 
|-id=692 bgcolor=#E9E9E9
| 139692 ||  || — || August 23, 2001 || Anderson Mesa || LONEOS || GEF || align=right | 2.3 km || 
|-id=693 bgcolor=#E9E9E9
| 139693 ||  || — || August 23, 2001 || Anderson Mesa || LONEOS || — || align=right | 4.3 km || 
|-id=694 bgcolor=#d6d6d6
| 139694 ||  || — || August 23, 2001 || Anderson Mesa || LONEOS || TEL || align=right | 2.3 km || 
|-id=695 bgcolor=#E9E9E9
| 139695 ||  || — || August 23, 2001 || Anderson Mesa || LONEOS || AGN || align=right | 1.9 km || 
|-id=696 bgcolor=#E9E9E9
| 139696 ||  || — || August 23, 2001 || Kitt Peak || Spacewatch || — || align=right | 3.7 km || 
|-id=697 bgcolor=#E9E9E9
| 139697 ||  || — || August 24, 2001 || Anderson Mesa || LONEOS || — || align=right | 3.8 km || 
|-id=698 bgcolor=#E9E9E9
| 139698 ||  || — || August 24, 2001 || Anderson Mesa || LONEOS || — || align=right | 4.0 km || 
|-id=699 bgcolor=#fefefe
| 139699 ||  || — || August 24, 2001 || Anderson Mesa || LONEOS || MAS || align=right | 1.3 km || 
|-id=700 bgcolor=#d6d6d6
| 139700 ||  || — || August 24, 2001 || Anderson Mesa || LONEOS || EOS || align=right | 3.7 km || 
|}

139701–139800 

|-bgcolor=#d6d6d6
| 139701 ||  || — || August 24, 2001 || Anderson Mesa || LONEOS || — || align=right | 5.0 km || 
|-id=702 bgcolor=#d6d6d6
| 139702 ||  || — || August 24, 2001 || Anderson Mesa || LONEOS || — || align=right | 6.3 km || 
|-id=703 bgcolor=#E9E9E9
| 139703 ||  || — || August 24, 2001 || Anderson Mesa || LONEOS || EUN || align=right | 2.5 km || 
|-id=704 bgcolor=#E9E9E9
| 139704 ||  || — || August 24, 2001 || Anderson Mesa || LONEOS || — || align=right | 4.2 km || 
|-id=705 bgcolor=#E9E9E9
| 139705 ||  || — || August 24, 2001 || Anderson Mesa || LONEOS || GEF || align=right | 1.7 km || 
|-id=706 bgcolor=#d6d6d6
| 139706 ||  || — || August 24, 2001 || Anderson Mesa || LONEOS || — || align=right | 5.1 km || 
|-id=707 bgcolor=#E9E9E9
| 139707 ||  || — || August 24, 2001 || Anderson Mesa || LONEOS || — || align=right | 2.6 km || 
|-id=708 bgcolor=#d6d6d6
| 139708 ||  || — || August 24, 2001 || Anderson Mesa || LONEOS || EOS || align=right | 3.8 km || 
|-id=709 bgcolor=#E9E9E9
| 139709 ||  || — || August 24, 2001 || Anderson Mesa || LONEOS || — || align=right | 3.3 km || 
|-id=710 bgcolor=#E9E9E9
| 139710 ||  || — || August 24, 2001 || Socorro || LINEAR || MAR || align=right | 2.1 km || 
|-id=711 bgcolor=#d6d6d6
| 139711 ||  || — || August 24, 2001 || Socorro || LINEAR || KOR || align=right | 3.0 km || 
|-id=712 bgcolor=#E9E9E9
| 139712 ||  || — || August 24, 2001 || Socorro || LINEAR || HOF || align=right | 4.8 km || 
|-id=713 bgcolor=#E9E9E9
| 139713 ||  || — || August 24, 2001 || Socorro || LINEAR || — || align=right | 4.2 km || 
|-id=714 bgcolor=#fefefe
| 139714 ||  || — || August 24, 2001 || Socorro || LINEAR || — || align=right | 3.7 km || 
|-id=715 bgcolor=#E9E9E9
| 139715 ||  || — || August 24, 2001 || Socorro || LINEAR || — || align=right | 1.9 km || 
|-id=716 bgcolor=#E9E9E9
| 139716 ||  || — || August 24, 2001 || Socorro || LINEAR || PAD || align=right | 3.0 km || 
|-id=717 bgcolor=#E9E9E9
| 139717 ||  || — || August 24, 2001 || Socorro || LINEAR || HEN || align=right | 1.6 km || 
|-id=718 bgcolor=#d6d6d6
| 139718 ||  || — || August 24, 2001 || Socorro || LINEAR || — || align=right | 5.2 km || 
|-id=719 bgcolor=#E9E9E9
| 139719 ||  || — || August 24, 2001 || Socorro || LINEAR || — || align=right | 1.8 km || 
|-id=720 bgcolor=#d6d6d6
| 139720 ||  || — || August 24, 2001 || Socorro || LINEAR || HYG || align=right | 4.5 km || 
|-id=721 bgcolor=#d6d6d6
| 139721 ||  || — || August 24, 2001 || Socorro || LINEAR || KOR || align=right | 3.6 km || 
|-id=722 bgcolor=#E9E9E9
| 139722 ||  || — || August 24, 2001 || Socorro || LINEAR || — || align=right | 3.4 km || 
|-id=723 bgcolor=#d6d6d6
| 139723 ||  || — || August 24, 2001 || Socorro || LINEAR || BRA || align=right | 2.3 km || 
|-id=724 bgcolor=#d6d6d6
| 139724 ||  || — || August 24, 2001 || Socorro || LINEAR || — || align=right | 6.0 km || 
|-id=725 bgcolor=#d6d6d6
| 139725 ||  || — || August 24, 2001 || Socorro || LINEAR || EOS || align=right | 5.2 km || 
|-id=726 bgcolor=#E9E9E9
| 139726 ||  || — || August 24, 2001 || Haleakala || NEAT || PAD || align=right | 3.1 km || 
|-id=727 bgcolor=#E9E9E9
| 139727 ||  || — || August 24, 2001 || Haleakala || NEAT || INO || align=right | 3.6 km || 
|-id=728 bgcolor=#E9E9E9
| 139728 ||  || — || August 24, 2001 || Haleakala || NEAT || — || align=right | 3.0 km || 
|-id=729 bgcolor=#d6d6d6
| 139729 ||  || — || August 24, 2001 || Haleakala || NEAT || — || align=right | 4.9 km || 
|-id=730 bgcolor=#E9E9E9
| 139730 ||  || — || August 25, 2001 || Socorro || LINEAR || GEF || align=right | 2.4 km || 
|-id=731 bgcolor=#E9E9E9
| 139731 ||  || — || August 25, 2001 || Anderson Mesa || LONEOS || — || align=right | 5.3 km || 
|-id=732 bgcolor=#E9E9E9
| 139732 ||  || — || August 25, 2001 || Socorro || LINEAR || — || align=right | 2.8 km || 
|-id=733 bgcolor=#E9E9E9
| 139733 ||  || — || August 25, 2001 || Socorro || LINEAR || DOR || align=right | 4.3 km || 
|-id=734 bgcolor=#d6d6d6
| 139734 ||  || — || August 25, 2001 || Socorro || LINEAR || — || align=right | 6.0 km || 
|-id=735 bgcolor=#d6d6d6
| 139735 ||  || — || August 25, 2001 || Socorro || LINEAR || EOS || align=right | 5.3 km || 
|-id=736 bgcolor=#E9E9E9
| 139736 ||  || — || August 25, 2001 || Socorro || LINEAR || CLO || align=right | 3.4 km || 
|-id=737 bgcolor=#E9E9E9
| 139737 ||  || — || August 25, 2001 || Socorro || LINEAR || — || align=right | 3.1 km || 
|-id=738 bgcolor=#E9E9E9
| 139738 ||  || — || August 25, 2001 || Socorro || LINEAR || JUN || align=right | 2.9 km || 
|-id=739 bgcolor=#E9E9E9
| 139739 ||  || — || August 25, 2001 || Kitt Peak || Spacewatch || — || align=right | 4.3 km || 
|-id=740 bgcolor=#d6d6d6
| 139740 ||  || — || August 26, 2001 || Socorro || LINEAR || EOS || align=right | 3.3 km || 
|-id=741 bgcolor=#E9E9E9
| 139741 ||  || — || August 20, 2001 || Palomar || NEAT || — || align=right | 4.7 km || 
|-id=742 bgcolor=#E9E9E9
| 139742 ||  || — || August 20, 2001 || Socorro || LINEAR || — || align=right | 2.3 km || 
|-id=743 bgcolor=#E9E9E9
| 139743 ||  || — || August 20, 2001 || Socorro || LINEAR || — || align=right | 3.2 km || 
|-id=744 bgcolor=#E9E9E9
| 139744 ||  || — || August 20, 2001 || Socorro || LINEAR || — || align=right | 2.0 km || 
|-id=745 bgcolor=#E9E9E9
| 139745 ||  || — || August 19, 2001 || Socorro || LINEAR || HEN || align=right | 2.0 km || 
|-id=746 bgcolor=#E9E9E9
| 139746 ||  || — || August 19, 2001 || Socorro || LINEAR || — || align=right | 3.7 km || 
|-id=747 bgcolor=#E9E9E9
| 139747 ||  || — || August 19, 2001 || Socorro || LINEAR || — || align=right | 3.0 km || 
|-id=748 bgcolor=#E9E9E9
| 139748 ||  || — || August 19, 2001 || Socorro || LINEAR || PAD || align=right | 4.1 km || 
|-id=749 bgcolor=#E9E9E9
| 139749 ||  || — || August 19, 2001 || Socorro || LINEAR || — || align=right | 2.7 km || 
|-id=750 bgcolor=#E9E9E9
| 139750 ||  || — || August 19, 2001 || Socorro || LINEAR || — || align=right | 6.0 km || 
|-id=751 bgcolor=#E9E9E9
| 139751 ||  || — || August 19, 2001 || Socorro || LINEAR || — || align=right | 3.9 km || 
|-id=752 bgcolor=#E9E9E9
| 139752 ||  || — || August 19, 2001 || Socorro || LINEAR || — || align=right | 2.6 km || 
|-id=753 bgcolor=#E9E9E9
| 139753 ||  || — || August 19, 2001 || Socorro || LINEAR || — || align=right | 5.4 km || 
|-id=754 bgcolor=#E9E9E9
| 139754 ||  || — || August 19, 2001 || Socorro || LINEAR || — || align=right | 4.5 km || 
|-id=755 bgcolor=#E9E9E9
| 139755 ||  || — || August 19, 2001 || Socorro || LINEAR || MAR || align=right | 2.4 km || 
|-id=756 bgcolor=#E9E9E9
| 139756 ||  || — || August 19, 2001 || Anderson Mesa || LONEOS || — || align=right | 3.2 km || 
|-id=757 bgcolor=#E9E9E9
| 139757 ||  || — || August 18, 2001 || Palomar || NEAT || — || align=right | 2.9 km || 
|-id=758 bgcolor=#E9E9E9
| 139758 ||  || — || August 18, 2001 || Socorro || LINEAR || HEN || align=right | 2.1 km || 
|-id=759 bgcolor=#d6d6d6
| 139759 ||  || — || August 18, 2001 || Palomar || NEAT || EUP || align=right | 9.2 km || 
|-id=760 bgcolor=#E9E9E9
| 139760 ||  || — || August 23, 2001 || Haleakala || NEAT || — || align=right | 3.4 km || 
|-id=761 bgcolor=#E9E9E9
| 139761 ||  || — || August 28, 2001 || Goodricke-Pigott || R. A. Tucker || — || align=right | 4.0 km || 
|-id=762 bgcolor=#E9E9E9
| 139762 ||  || — || August 17, 2001 || Socorro || LINEAR || PAD || align=right | 3.4 km || 
|-id=763 bgcolor=#E9E9E9
| 139763 ||  || — || August 17, 2001 || Socorro || LINEAR || — || align=right | 2.1 km || 
|-id=764 bgcolor=#d6d6d6
| 139764 ||  || — || August 17, 2001 || Socorro || LINEAR || — || align=right | 4.1 km || 
|-id=765 bgcolor=#E9E9E9
| 139765 ||  || — || August 17, 2001 || Palomar || NEAT || JUN || align=right | 2.5 km || 
|-id=766 bgcolor=#E9E9E9
| 139766 ||  || — || August 16, 2001 || Socorro || LINEAR || AGN || align=right | 2.3 km || 
|-id=767 bgcolor=#E9E9E9
| 139767 ||  || — || August 31, 2001 || Palomar || NEAT || — || align=right | 3.5 km || 
|-id=768 bgcolor=#d6d6d6
| 139768 ||  || — || August 16, 2001 || Socorro || LINEAR || — || align=right | 4.0 km || 
|-id=769 bgcolor=#E9E9E9
| 139769 ||  || — || August 16, 2001 || Socorro || LINEAR || GEF || align=right | 2.7 km || 
|-id=770 bgcolor=#E9E9E9
| 139770 ||  || — || August 22, 2001 || Kiso || Y. Ohba || — || align=right | 2.9 km || 
|-id=771 bgcolor=#E9E9E9
| 139771 ||  || — || August 24, 2001 || Anderson Mesa || LONEOS || — || align=right | 3.4 km || 
|-id=772 bgcolor=#d6d6d6
| 139772 ||  || — || August 24, 2001 || Socorro || LINEAR || MEL || align=right | 8.1 km || 
|-id=773 bgcolor=#E9E9E9
| 139773 ||  || — || August 24, 2001 || Socorro || LINEAR || — || align=right | 2.3 km || 
|-id=774 bgcolor=#d6d6d6
| 139774 ||  || — || August 24, 2001 || Socorro || LINEAR || THM || align=right | 5.8 km || 
|-id=775 bgcolor=#C2E0FF
| 139775 ||  || — || August 19, 2001 || Cerro Tololo || M. W. Buie || plutinomoon || align=right | 186 km || 
|-id=776 bgcolor=#d6d6d6
| 139776 ||  || — || August 19, 2001 || Cerro Tololo || M. W. Buie || KOR || align=right | 3.4 km || 
|-id=777 bgcolor=#E9E9E9
| 139777 ||  || — || August 20, 2001 || Cerro Tololo || M. W. Buie || PAD || align=right | 3.6 km || 
|-id=778 bgcolor=#d6d6d6
| 139778 ||  || — || August 20, 2001 || Palomar || NEAT || — || align=right | 5.9 km || 
|-id=779 bgcolor=#E9E9E9
| 139779 ||  || — || August 29, 2001 || Palomar || NEAT || — || align=right | 2.7 km || 
|-id=780 bgcolor=#E9E9E9
| 139780 ||  || — || August 16, 2001 || Socorro || LINEAR || GEF || align=right | 1.9 km || 
|-id=781 bgcolor=#E9E9E9
| 139781 ||  || — || August 19, 2001 || Cerro Tololo || Cerro Tololo Obs. || AGN || align=right | 1.6 km || 
|-id=782 bgcolor=#E9E9E9
| 139782 ||  || — || August 23, 2001 || Anderson Mesa || LONEOS || — || align=right | 2.3 km || 
|-id=783 bgcolor=#E9E9E9
| 139783 ||  || — || August 27, 2001 || Anderson Mesa || LONEOS || — || align=right | 4.5 km || 
|-id=784 bgcolor=#E9E9E9
| 139784 || 2001 RW || — || September 8, 2001 || Goodricke-Pigott || R. A. Tucker || — || align=right | 3.4 km || 
|-id=785 bgcolor=#E9E9E9
| 139785 ||  || — || September 8, 2001 || Anderson Mesa || LONEOS || — || align=right | 5.3 km || 
|-id=786 bgcolor=#E9E9E9
| 139786 ||  || — || September 7, 2001 || Socorro || LINEAR || — || align=right | 3.0 km || 
|-id=787 bgcolor=#E9E9E9
| 139787 ||  || — || September 7, 2001 || Socorro || LINEAR || — || align=right | 3.6 km || 
|-id=788 bgcolor=#E9E9E9
| 139788 ||  || — || September 8, 2001 || Socorro || LINEAR || — || align=right | 3.7 km || 
|-id=789 bgcolor=#d6d6d6
| 139789 ||  || — || September 8, 2001 || Socorro || LINEAR || CHA || align=right | 3.8 km || 
|-id=790 bgcolor=#d6d6d6
| 139790 ||  || — || September 10, 2001 || Badlands || R. Dyvig || EOS || align=right | 4.6 km || 
|-id=791 bgcolor=#d6d6d6
| 139791 ||  || — || September 10, 2001 || Desert Eagle || W. K. Y. Yeung || — || align=right | 4.9 km || 
|-id=792 bgcolor=#E9E9E9
| 139792 ||  || — || September 8, 2001 || Socorro || LINEAR || — || align=right | 2.5 km || 
|-id=793 bgcolor=#d6d6d6
| 139793 ||  || — || September 8, 2001 || Socorro || LINEAR || — || align=right | 3.7 km || 
|-id=794 bgcolor=#d6d6d6
| 139794 ||  || — || September 8, 2001 || Socorro || LINEAR || EOS || align=right | 3.1 km || 
|-id=795 bgcolor=#d6d6d6
| 139795 ||  || — || September 8, 2001 || Socorro || LINEAR || — || align=right | 4.4 km || 
|-id=796 bgcolor=#d6d6d6
| 139796 ||  || — || September 8, 2001 || Socorro || LINEAR || KOR || align=right | 2.6 km || 
|-id=797 bgcolor=#E9E9E9
| 139797 ||  || — || September 10, 2001 || Socorro || LINEAR || HNS || align=right | 2.5 km || 
|-id=798 bgcolor=#FA8072
| 139798 ||  || — || September 10, 2001 || Socorro || LINEAR || H || align=right | 1.1 km || 
|-id=799 bgcolor=#d6d6d6
| 139799 ||  || — || September 10, 2001 || Desert Eagle || W. K. Y. Yeung || 3:2 || align=right | 12 km || 
|-id=800 bgcolor=#E9E9E9
| 139800 ||  || — || September 8, 2001 || Socorro || LINEAR || — || align=right | 4.2 km || 
|}

139801–139900 

|-bgcolor=#E9E9E9
| 139801 ||  || — || September 10, 2001 || Socorro || LINEAR || HOF || align=right | 2.8 km || 
|-id=802 bgcolor=#E9E9E9
| 139802 ||  || — || September 10, 2001 || Socorro || LINEAR || HNS || align=right | 1.9 km || 
|-id=803 bgcolor=#E9E9E9
| 139803 ||  || — || September 7, 2001 || Socorro || LINEAR || PAD || align=right | 4.2 km || 
|-id=804 bgcolor=#d6d6d6
| 139804 ||  || — || September 10, 2001 || Farpoint || G. Hug || 615 || align=right | 1.7 km || 
|-id=805 bgcolor=#d6d6d6
| 139805 ||  || — || September 11, 2001 || Desert Eagle || W. K. Y. Yeung || — || align=right | 4.6 km || 
|-id=806 bgcolor=#E9E9E9
| 139806 ||  || — || September 11, 2001 || Desert Eagle || W. K. Y. Yeung || — || align=right | 2.2 km || 
|-id=807 bgcolor=#d6d6d6
| 139807 ||  || — || September 11, 2001 || Desert Eagle || W. K. Y. Yeung || EOS || align=right | 7.9 km || 
|-id=808 bgcolor=#fefefe
| 139808 ||  || — || September 7, 2001 || Socorro || LINEAR || V || align=right | 1.2 km || 
|-id=809 bgcolor=#E9E9E9
| 139809 ||  || — || September 7, 2001 || Socorro || LINEAR || — || align=right | 3.4 km || 
|-id=810 bgcolor=#E9E9E9
| 139810 ||  || — || September 7, 2001 || Socorro || LINEAR || — || align=right | 2.9 km || 
|-id=811 bgcolor=#E9E9E9
| 139811 ||  || — || September 7, 2001 || Socorro || LINEAR || MRX || align=right | 1.7 km || 
|-id=812 bgcolor=#E9E9E9
| 139812 ||  || — || September 7, 2001 || Socorro || LINEAR || — || align=right | 3.2 km || 
|-id=813 bgcolor=#E9E9E9
| 139813 ||  || — || September 7, 2001 || Socorro || LINEAR || AGN || align=right | 2.1 km || 
|-id=814 bgcolor=#E9E9E9
| 139814 ||  || — || September 7, 2001 || Socorro || LINEAR || — || align=right | 4.7 km || 
|-id=815 bgcolor=#E9E9E9
| 139815 ||  || — || September 7, 2001 || Socorro || LINEAR || — || align=right | 5.0 km || 
|-id=816 bgcolor=#E9E9E9
| 139816 ||  || — || September 7, 2001 || Socorro || LINEAR || AGN || align=right | 2.3 km || 
|-id=817 bgcolor=#d6d6d6
| 139817 ||  || — || September 7, 2001 || Socorro || LINEAR || — || align=right | 5.0 km || 
|-id=818 bgcolor=#E9E9E9
| 139818 ||  || — || September 7, 2001 || Socorro || LINEAR || AGN || align=right | 2.0 km || 
|-id=819 bgcolor=#d6d6d6
| 139819 ||  || — || September 7, 2001 || Socorro || LINEAR || — || align=right | 3.7 km || 
|-id=820 bgcolor=#E9E9E9
| 139820 ||  || — || September 7, 2001 || Socorro || LINEAR || — || align=right | 3.8 km || 
|-id=821 bgcolor=#E9E9E9
| 139821 ||  || — || September 7, 2001 || Socorro || LINEAR || — || align=right | 4.0 km || 
|-id=822 bgcolor=#E9E9E9
| 139822 ||  || — || September 7, 2001 || Socorro || LINEAR || — || align=right | 1.9 km || 
|-id=823 bgcolor=#d6d6d6
| 139823 ||  || — || September 7, 2001 || Socorro || LINEAR || KOR || align=right | 2.1 km || 
|-id=824 bgcolor=#E9E9E9
| 139824 ||  || — || September 7, 2001 || Socorro || LINEAR || AGN || align=right | 2.3 km || 
|-id=825 bgcolor=#E9E9E9
| 139825 ||  || — || September 8, 2001 || Socorro || LINEAR || EUN || align=right | 2.5 km || 
|-id=826 bgcolor=#E9E9E9
| 139826 ||  || — || September 8, 2001 || Socorro || LINEAR || — || align=right | 5.5 km || 
|-id=827 bgcolor=#E9E9E9
| 139827 ||  || — || September 8, 2001 || Socorro || LINEAR || — || align=right | 3.7 km || 
|-id=828 bgcolor=#E9E9E9
| 139828 ||  || — || September 8, 2001 || Socorro || LINEAR || — || align=right | 3.9 km || 
|-id=829 bgcolor=#E9E9E9
| 139829 ||  || — || September 8, 2001 || Socorro || LINEAR || DOR || align=right | 5.5 km || 
|-id=830 bgcolor=#E9E9E9
| 139830 ||  || — || September 8, 2001 || Socorro || LINEAR || — || align=right | 2.7 km || 
|-id=831 bgcolor=#E9E9E9
| 139831 ||  || — || September 8, 2001 || Socorro || LINEAR || — || align=right | 4.3 km || 
|-id=832 bgcolor=#d6d6d6
| 139832 ||  || — || September 8, 2001 || Socorro || LINEAR || — || align=right | 3.9 km || 
|-id=833 bgcolor=#d6d6d6
| 139833 ||  || — || September 8, 2001 || Socorro || LINEAR || — || align=right | 4.8 km || 
|-id=834 bgcolor=#E9E9E9
| 139834 ||  || — || September 8, 2001 || Socorro || LINEAR || — || align=right | 3.9 km || 
|-id=835 bgcolor=#E9E9E9
| 139835 ||  || — || September 8, 2001 || Socorro || LINEAR || — || align=right | 2.4 km || 
|-id=836 bgcolor=#d6d6d6
| 139836 ||  || — || September 8, 2001 || Socorro || LINEAR || — || align=right | 4.5 km || 
|-id=837 bgcolor=#E9E9E9
| 139837 ||  || — || September 10, 2001 || Socorro || LINEAR || — || align=right | 4.2 km || 
|-id=838 bgcolor=#E9E9E9
| 139838 ||  || — || September 10, 2001 || Socorro || LINEAR || JUN || align=right | 2.5 km || 
|-id=839 bgcolor=#E9E9E9
| 139839 ||  || — || September 11, 2001 || Socorro || LINEAR || AGN || align=right | 2.1 km || 
|-id=840 bgcolor=#E9E9E9
| 139840 ||  || — || September 9, 2001 || Palomar || NEAT || — || align=right | 3.3 km || 
|-id=841 bgcolor=#E9E9E9
| 139841 ||  || — || September 11, 2001 || Oakley || Oakley Obs. || — || align=right | 1.9 km || 
|-id=842 bgcolor=#d6d6d6
| 139842 ||  || — || September 10, 2001 || Desert Eagle || W. K. Y. Yeung || — || align=right | 3.5 km || 
|-id=843 bgcolor=#E9E9E9
| 139843 ||  || — || September 12, 2001 || Palomar || NEAT || — || align=right | 3.4 km || 
|-id=844 bgcolor=#E9E9E9
| 139844 ||  || — || September 11, 2001 || Desert Eagle || W. K. Y. Yeung || AGN || align=right | 2.4 km || 
|-id=845 bgcolor=#E9E9E9
| 139845 ||  || — || September 11, 2001 || Socorro || LINEAR || — || align=right | 5.6 km || 
|-id=846 bgcolor=#E9E9E9
| 139846 ||  || — || September 11, 2001 || Socorro || LINEAR || — || align=right | 3.7 km || 
|-id=847 bgcolor=#d6d6d6
| 139847 ||  || — || September 12, 2001 || Socorro || LINEAR || — || align=right | 7.5 km || 
|-id=848 bgcolor=#E9E9E9
| 139848 ||  || — || September 12, 2001 || Socorro || LINEAR || — || align=right | 4.0 km || 
|-id=849 bgcolor=#d6d6d6
| 139849 ||  || — || September 12, 2001 || Socorro || LINEAR || EOS || align=right | 2.6 km || 
|-id=850 bgcolor=#d6d6d6
| 139850 ||  || — || September 12, 2001 || Socorro || LINEAR || KOR || align=right | 3.7 km || 
|-id=851 bgcolor=#E9E9E9
| 139851 ||  || — || September 12, 2001 || Socorro || LINEAR || — || align=right | 3.1 km || 
|-id=852 bgcolor=#d6d6d6
| 139852 ||  || — || September 12, 2001 || Socorro || LINEAR || KOR || align=right | 2.5 km || 
|-id=853 bgcolor=#E9E9E9
| 139853 ||  || — || September 12, 2001 || Socorro || LINEAR || — || align=right | 4.3 km || 
|-id=854 bgcolor=#d6d6d6
| 139854 ||  || — || September 12, 2001 || Socorro || LINEAR || — || align=right | 5.8 km || 
|-id=855 bgcolor=#E9E9E9
| 139855 ||  || — || September 12, 2001 || Socorro || LINEAR || HOF || align=right | 4.4 km || 
|-id=856 bgcolor=#d6d6d6
| 139856 ||  || — || September 12, 2001 || Socorro || LINEAR || — || align=right | 4.7 km || 
|-id=857 bgcolor=#d6d6d6
| 139857 ||  || — || September 12, 2001 || Socorro || LINEAR || — || align=right | 3.3 km || 
|-id=858 bgcolor=#d6d6d6
| 139858 ||  || — || September 12, 2001 || Socorro || LINEAR || fast? || align=right | 3.9 km || 
|-id=859 bgcolor=#d6d6d6
| 139859 ||  || — || September 10, 2001 || Socorro || LINEAR || EOS || align=right | 4.4 km || 
|-id=860 bgcolor=#d6d6d6
| 139860 ||  || — || September 10, 2001 || Socorro || LINEAR || — || align=right | 5.9 km || 
|-id=861 bgcolor=#d6d6d6
| 139861 ||  || — || September 10, 2001 || Socorro || LINEAR || CHA || align=right | 3.9 km || 
|-id=862 bgcolor=#d6d6d6
| 139862 ||  || — || September 10, 2001 || Socorro || LINEAR || 615 || align=right | 2.7 km || 
|-id=863 bgcolor=#d6d6d6
| 139863 ||  || — || September 10, 2001 || Socorro || LINEAR || — || align=right | 6.1 km || 
|-id=864 bgcolor=#d6d6d6
| 139864 ||  || — || September 10, 2001 || Socorro || LINEAR || — || align=right | 4.5 km || 
|-id=865 bgcolor=#E9E9E9
| 139865 ||  || — || September 10, 2001 || Socorro || LINEAR || MRX || align=right | 1.9 km || 
|-id=866 bgcolor=#E9E9E9
| 139866 ||  || — || September 10, 2001 || Socorro || LINEAR || — || align=right | 4.8 km || 
|-id=867 bgcolor=#E9E9E9
| 139867 ||  || — || September 10, 2001 || Socorro || LINEAR || MRX || align=right | 2.2 km || 
|-id=868 bgcolor=#d6d6d6
| 139868 ||  || — || September 10, 2001 || Socorro || LINEAR || HYG || align=right | 6.5 km || 
|-id=869 bgcolor=#E9E9E9
| 139869 ||  || — || September 10, 2001 || Socorro || LINEAR || — || align=right | 2.3 km || 
|-id=870 bgcolor=#d6d6d6
| 139870 ||  || — || September 10, 2001 || Socorro || LINEAR || — || align=right | 3.8 km || 
|-id=871 bgcolor=#d6d6d6
| 139871 ||  || — || September 10, 2001 || Socorro || LINEAR || — || align=right | 7.2 km || 
|-id=872 bgcolor=#d6d6d6
| 139872 ||  || — || September 10, 2001 || Socorro || LINEAR || — || align=right | 7.5 km || 
|-id=873 bgcolor=#E9E9E9
| 139873 ||  || — || September 10, 2001 || Socorro || LINEAR || DOR || align=right | 7.0 km || 
|-id=874 bgcolor=#d6d6d6
| 139874 ||  || — || September 10, 2001 || Socorro || LINEAR || — || align=right | 6.5 km || 
|-id=875 bgcolor=#E9E9E9
| 139875 ||  || — || September 11, 2001 || Anderson Mesa || LONEOS || — || align=right | 3.3 km || 
|-id=876 bgcolor=#E9E9E9
| 139876 ||  || — || September 11, 2001 || Anderson Mesa || LONEOS || — || align=right | 4.4 km || 
|-id=877 bgcolor=#d6d6d6
| 139877 ||  || — || September 11, 2001 || Anderson Mesa || LONEOS || EOS || align=right | 3.2 km || 
|-id=878 bgcolor=#d6d6d6
| 139878 ||  || — || September 11, 2001 || Anderson Mesa || LONEOS || EOS || align=right | 3.3 km || 
|-id=879 bgcolor=#d6d6d6
| 139879 ||  || — || September 11, 2001 || Anderson Mesa || LONEOS || — || align=right | 3.9 km || 
|-id=880 bgcolor=#fefefe
| 139880 ||  || — || September 11, 2001 || Anderson Mesa || LONEOS || — || align=right | 1.6 km || 
|-id=881 bgcolor=#E9E9E9
| 139881 ||  || — || September 11, 2001 || Anderson Mesa || LONEOS || — || align=right | 5.0 km || 
|-id=882 bgcolor=#d6d6d6
| 139882 ||  || — || September 11, 2001 || Anderson Mesa || LONEOS || EOS || align=right | 3.4 km || 
|-id=883 bgcolor=#d6d6d6
| 139883 ||  || — || September 11, 2001 || Anderson Mesa || LONEOS || — || align=right | 6.8 km || 
|-id=884 bgcolor=#E9E9E9
| 139884 ||  || — || September 11, 2001 || Anderson Mesa || LONEOS || — || align=right | 5.0 km || 
|-id=885 bgcolor=#d6d6d6
| 139885 ||  || — || September 11, 2001 || Anderson Mesa || LONEOS || — || align=right | 5.9 km || 
|-id=886 bgcolor=#d6d6d6
| 139886 ||  || — || September 11, 2001 || Anderson Mesa || LONEOS || — || align=right | 4.4 km || 
|-id=887 bgcolor=#d6d6d6
| 139887 ||  || — || September 11, 2001 || Anderson Mesa || LONEOS || — || align=right | 4.9 km || 
|-id=888 bgcolor=#d6d6d6
| 139888 ||  || — || September 11, 2001 || Anderson Mesa || LONEOS || KOR || align=right | 3.4 km || 
|-id=889 bgcolor=#E9E9E9
| 139889 ||  || — || September 11, 2001 || Anderson Mesa || LONEOS || — || align=right | 4.2 km || 
|-id=890 bgcolor=#d6d6d6
| 139890 ||  || — || September 11, 2001 || Anderson Mesa || LONEOS || KOR || align=right | 2.5 km || 
|-id=891 bgcolor=#d6d6d6
| 139891 ||  || — || September 11, 2001 || Anderson Mesa || LONEOS || — || align=right | 4.5 km || 
|-id=892 bgcolor=#d6d6d6
| 139892 ||  || — || September 11, 2001 || Anderson Mesa || LONEOS || — || align=right | 4.2 km || 
|-id=893 bgcolor=#d6d6d6
| 139893 ||  || — || September 11, 2001 || Anderson Mesa || LONEOS || KOR || align=right | 4.4 km || 
|-id=894 bgcolor=#d6d6d6
| 139894 ||  || — || September 11, 2001 || Anderson Mesa || LONEOS || — || align=right | 6.4 km || 
|-id=895 bgcolor=#d6d6d6
| 139895 ||  || — || September 11, 2001 || Anderson Mesa || LONEOS || EOS || align=right | 4.5 km || 
|-id=896 bgcolor=#d6d6d6
| 139896 ||  || — || September 11, 2001 || Anderson Mesa || LONEOS || TEL || align=right | 4.2 km || 
|-id=897 bgcolor=#d6d6d6
| 139897 ||  || — || September 12, 2001 || Socorro || LINEAR || — || align=right | 4.8 km || 
|-id=898 bgcolor=#E9E9E9
| 139898 ||  || — || September 12, 2001 || Socorro || LINEAR || — || align=right | 2.5 km || 
|-id=899 bgcolor=#E9E9E9
| 139899 ||  || — || September 11, 2001 || Kitt Peak || Spacewatch || AEO || align=right | 3.6 km || 
|-id=900 bgcolor=#E9E9E9
| 139900 ||  || — || September 12, 2001 || Kitt Peak || Spacewatch || — || align=right | 2.7 km || 
|}

139901–140000 

|-bgcolor=#d6d6d6
| 139901 ||  || — || September 12, 2001 || Socorro || LINEAR || — || align=right | 4.3 km || 
|-id=902 bgcolor=#E9E9E9
| 139902 ||  || — || September 12, 2001 || Socorro || LINEAR || — || align=right | 4.2 km || 
|-id=903 bgcolor=#E9E9E9
| 139903 ||  || — || September 12, 2001 || Socorro || LINEAR || — || align=right | 4.5 km || 
|-id=904 bgcolor=#E9E9E9
| 139904 ||  || — || September 12, 2001 || Socorro || LINEAR || — || align=right | 4.1 km || 
|-id=905 bgcolor=#E9E9E9
| 139905 ||  || — || September 12, 2001 || Socorro || LINEAR || MAR || align=right | 2.7 km || 
|-id=906 bgcolor=#E9E9E9
| 139906 ||  || — || September 12, 2001 || Socorro || LINEAR || — || align=right | 2.8 km || 
|-id=907 bgcolor=#E9E9E9
| 139907 ||  || — || September 12, 2001 || Socorro || LINEAR || — || align=right | 3.4 km || 
|-id=908 bgcolor=#E9E9E9
| 139908 ||  || — || September 12, 2001 || Socorro || LINEAR || — || align=right | 5.6 km || 
|-id=909 bgcolor=#E9E9E9
| 139909 ||  || — || September 12, 2001 || Socorro || LINEAR || — || align=right | 4.1 km || 
|-id=910 bgcolor=#E9E9E9
| 139910 ||  || — || September 12, 2001 || Socorro || LINEAR || — || align=right | 3.3 km || 
|-id=911 bgcolor=#E9E9E9
| 139911 ||  || — || September 12, 2001 || Socorro || LINEAR || PAD || align=right | 4.5 km || 
|-id=912 bgcolor=#E9E9E9
| 139912 ||  || — || September 12, 2001 || Socorro || LINEAR || — || align=right | 3.4 km || 
|-id=913 bgcolor=#E9E9E9
| 139913 ||  || — || September 12, 2001 || Socorro || LINEAR || — || align=right | 4.3 km || 
|-id=914 bgcolor=#E9E9E9
| 139914 ||  || — || September 12, 2001 || Socorro || LINEAR || — || align=right | 3.5 km || 
|-id=915 bgcolor=#E9E9E9
| 139915 ||  || — || September 12, 2001 || Socorro || LINEAR || HNA || align=right | 5.3 km || 
|-id=916 bgcolor=#d6d6d6
| 139916 ||  || — || September 12, 2001 || Socorro || LINEAR || KAR || align=right | 2.5 km || 
|-id=917 bgcolor=#d6d6d6
| 139917 ||  || — || September 12, 2001 || Socorro || LINEAR || KOR || align=right | 2.7 km || 
|-id=918 bgcolor=#d6d6d6
| 139918 ||  || — || September 12, 2001 || Socorro || LINEAR || EOS || align=right | 3.4 km || 
|-id=919 bgcolor=#d6d6d6
| 139919 ||  || — || September 12, 2001 || Socorro || LINEAR || — || align=right | 5.4 km || 
|-id=920 bgcolor=#d6d6d6
| 139920 ||  || — || September 12, 2001 || Socorro || LINEAR || KOR || align=right | 2.4 km || 
|-id=921 bgcolor=#E9E9E9
| 139921 ||  || — || September 12, 2001 || Socorro || LINEAR || — || align=right | 3.2 km || 
|-id=922 bgcolor=#E9E9E9
| 139922 ||  || — || September 12, 2001 || Socorro || LINEAR || AST || align=right | 5.9 km || 
|-id=923 bgcolor=#d6d6d6
| 139923 ||  || — || September 12, 2001 || Socorro || LINEAR || — || align=right | 4.3 km || 
|-id=924 bgcolor=#d6d6d6
| 139924 ||  || — || September 12, 2001 || Socorro || LINEAR || — || align=right | 5.3 km || 
|-id=925 bgcolor=#E9E9E9
| 139925 ||  || — || September 12, 2001 || Socorro || LINEAR || — || align=right | 5.3 km || 
|-id=926 bgcolor=#E9E9E9
| 139926 ||  || — || September 12, 2001 || Socorro || LINEAR || HEN || align=right | 1.8 km || 
|-id=927 bgcolor=#E9E9E9
| 139927 ||  || — || September 12, 2001 || Socorro || LINEAR || — || align=right | 2.6 km || 
|-id=928 bgcolor=#E9E9E9
| 139928 ||  || — || September 12, 2001 || Socorro || LINEAR || NEM || align=right | 3.4 km || 
|-id=929 bgcolor=#d6d6d6
| 139929 ||  || — || September 12, 2001 || Socorro || LINEAR || — || align=right | 4.8 km || 
|-id=930 bgcolor=#d6d6d6
| 139930 ||  || — || September 12, 2001 || Socorro || LINEAR || KOR || align=right | 2.9 km || 
|-id=931 bgcolor=#E9E9E9
| 139931 ||  || — || September 12, 2001 || Socorro || LINEAR || — || align=right | 4.3 km || 
|-id=932 bgcolor=#d6d6d6
| 139932 ||  || — || September 12, 2001 || Socorro || LINEAR || EOS || align=right | 3.5 km || 
|-id=933 bgcolor=#d6d6d6
| 139933 ||  || — || September 12, 2001 || Socorro || LINEAR || KOR || align=right | 3.2 km || 
|-id=934 bgcolor=#d6d6d6
| 139934 ||  || — || September 12, 2001 || Socorro || LINEAR || — || align=right | 5.2 km || 
|-id=935 bgcolor=#d6d6d6
| 139935 ||  || — || September 12, 2001 || Socorro || LINEAR || KOR || align=right | 3.0 km || 
|-id=936 bgcolor=#d6d6d6
| 139936 ||  || — || September 12, 2001 || Socorro || LINEAR || — || align=right | 5.3 km || 
|-id=937 bgcolor=#E9E9E9
| 139937 ||  || — || September 12, 2001 || Socorro || LINEAR || — || align=right | 4.1 km || 
|-id=938 bgcolor=#d6d6d6
| 139938 ||  || — || September 12, 2001 || Socorro || LINEAR || 628 || align=right | 4.0 km || 
|-id=939 bgcolor=#d6d6d6
| 139939 ||  || — || September 12, 2001 || Socorro || LINEAR || — || align=right | 5.4 km || 
|-id=940 bgcolor=#E9E9E9
| 139940 ||  || — || September 12, 2001 || Socorro || LINEAR || GEF || align=right | 1.9 km || 
|-id=941 bgcolor=#E9E9E9
| 139941 ||  || — || September 12, 2001 || Socorro || LINEAR || — || align=right | 3.4 km || 
|-id=942 bgcolor=#d6d6d6
| 139942 ||  || — || September 12, 2001 || Socorro || LINEAR || — || align=right | 4.3 km || 
|-id=943 bgcolor=#E9E9E9
| 139943 ||  || — || September 12, 2001 || Socorro || LINEAR || AER || align=right | 2.6 km || 
|-id=944 bgcolor=#E9E9E9
| 139944 ||  || — || September 12, 2001 || Socorro || LINEAR || — || align=right | 5.0 km || 
|-id=945 bgcolor=#E9E9E9
| 139945 ||  || — || September 12, 2001 || Socorro || LINEAR || — || align=right | 3.4 km || 
|-id=946 bgcolor=#E9E9E9
| 139946 ||  || — || September 12, 2001 || Socorro || LINEAR || ADE || align=right | 3.9 km || 
|-id=947 bgcolor=#E9E9E9
| 139947 ||  || — || September 12, 2001 || Socorro || LINEAR || — || align=right | 3.5 km || 
|-id=948 bgcolor=#d6d6d6
| 139948 ||  || — || September 12, 2001 || Socorro || LINEAR || — || align=right | 3.7 km || 
|-id=949 bgcolor=#E9E9E9
| 139949 ||  || — || September 12, 2001 || Socorro || LINEAR || — || align=right | 2.7 km || 
|-id=950 bgcolor=#E9E9E9
| 139950 ||  || — || September 12, 2001 || Socorro || LINEAR || GEF || align=right | 2.2 km || 
|-id=951 bgcolor=#d6d6d6
| 139951 ||  || — || September 8, 2001 || Socorro || LINEAR || — || align=right | 7.0 km || 
|-id=952 bgcolor=#d6d6d6
| 139952 ||  || — || September 11, 2001 || Palomar || NEAT || — || align=right | 6.3 km || 
|-id=953 bgcolor=#d6d6d6
| 139953 ||  || — || September 7, 2001 || Palomar || NEAT || — || align=right | 6.9 km || 
|-id=954 bgcolor=#E9E9E9
| 139954 ||  || — || September 8, 2001 || Socorro || LINEAR || — || align=right | 4.0 km || 
|-id=955 bgcolor=#E9E9E9
| 139955 ||  || — || September 10, 2001 || Anderson Mesa || LONEOS || EUN || align=right | 2.4 km || 
|-id=956 bgcolor=#E9E9E9
| 139956 ||  || — || September 11, 2001 || Anderson Mesa || LONEOS || — || align=right | 4.1 km || 
|-id=957 bgcolor=#E9E9E9
| 139957 ||  || — || September 12, 2001 || Socorro || LINEAR || — || align=right | 2.3 km || 
|-id=958 bgcolor=#E9E9E9
| 139958 ||  || — || September 12, 2001 || Socorro || LINEAR || — || align=right | 4.2 km || 
|-id=959 bgcolor=#E9E9E9
| 139959 ||  || — || September 14, 2001 || Palomar || NEAT || — || align=right | 2.0 km || 
|-id=960 bgcolor=#E9E9E9
| 139960 ||  || — || September 11, 2001 || Anderson Mesa || LONEOS || — || align=right | 2.4 km || 
|-id=961 bgcolor=#E9E9E9
| 139961 ||  || — || September 16, 2001 || Socorro || LINEAR || — || align=right | 3.4 km || 
|-id=962 bgcolor=#d6d6d6
| 139962 ||  || — || September 17, 2001 || Goodricke-Pigott || R. A. Tucker || EOS || align=right | 4.5 km || 
|-id=963 bgcolor=#E9E9E9
| 139963 ||  || — || September 18, 2001 || Kitt Peak || Spacewatch || — || align=right | 3.4 km || 
|-id=964 bgcolor=#d6d6d6
| 139964 ||  || — || September 18, 2001 || Kitt Peak || Spacewatch || THM || align=right | 5.8 km || 
|-id=965 bgcolor=#E9E9E9
| 139965 ||  || — || September 16, 2001 || Socorro || LINEAR || — || align=right | 2.8 km || 
|-id=966 bgcolor=#E9E9E9
| 139966 ||  || — || September 16, 2001 || Socorro || LINEAR || — || align=right | 4.2 km || 
|-id=967 bgcolor=#E9E9E9
| 139967 ||  || — || September 16, 2001 || Socorro || LINEAR || — || align=right | 3.6 km || 
|-id=968 bgcolor=#d6d6d6
| 139968 ||  || — || September 16, 2001 || Socorro || LINEAR || — || align=right | 3.3 km || 
|-id=969 bgcolor=#E9E9E9
| 139969 ||  || — || September 16, 2001 || Socorro || LINEAR || MRX || align=right | 2.0 km || 
|-id=970 bgcolor=#E9E9E9
| 139970 ||  || — || September 16, 2001 || Socorro || LINEAR || NEM || align=right | 4.1 km || 
|-id=971 bgcolor=#d6d6d6
| 139971 ||  || — || September 16, 2001 || Socorro || LINEAR || THM || align=right | 3.8 km || 
|-id=972 bgcolor=#E9E9E9
| 139972 ||  || — || September 16, 2001 || Socorro || LINEAR || — || align=right | 3.5 km || 
|-id=973 bgcolor=#E9E9E9
| 139973 ||  || — || September 16, 2001 || Socorro || LINEAR || — || align=right | 2.9 km || 
|-id=974 bgcolor=#d6d6d6
| 139974 ||  || — || September 16, 2001 || Socorro || LINEAR || — || align=right | 4.8 km || 
|-id=975 bgcolor=#E9E9E9
| 139975 ||  || — || September 16, 2001 || Socorro || LINEAR || WIT || align=right | 2.3 km || 
|-id=976 bgcolor=#d6d6d6
| 139976 ||  || — || September 16, 2001 || Socorro || LINEAR || TEL || align=right | 2.9 km || 
|-id=977 bgcolor=#d6d6d6
| 139977 ||  || — || September 16, 2001 || Socorro || LINEAR || KOR || align=right | 2.4 km || 
|-id=978 bgcolor=#E9E9E9
| 139978 ||  || — || September 16, 2001 || Socorro || LINEAR || — || align=right | 3.9 km || 
|-id=979 bgcolor=#d6d6d6
| 139979 ||  || — || September 16, 2001 || Socorro || LINEAR || KOR || align=right | 1.9 km || 
|-id=980 bgcolor=#d6d6d6
| 139980 ||  || — || September 16, 2001 || Socorro || LINEAR || — || align=right | 4.4 km || 
|-id=981 bgcolor=#d6d6d6
| 139981 ||  || — || September 16, 2001 || Socorro || LINEAR || EOS || align=right | 2.8 km || 
|-id=982 bgcolor=#d6d6d6
| 139982 ||  || — || September 16, 2001 || Socorro || LINEAR || — || align=right | 4.1 km || 
|-id=983 bgcolor=#d6d6d6
| 139983 ||  || — || September 16, 2001 || Socorro || LINEAR || — || align=right | 4.3 km || 
|-id=984 bgcolor=#E9E9E9
| 139984 ||  || — || September 16, 2001 || Socorro || LINEAR || — || align=right | 2.2 km || 
|-id=985 bgcolor=#d6d6d6
| 139985 ||  || — || September 16, 2001 || Socorro || LINEAR || 628 || align=right | 3.8 km || 
|-id=986 bgcolor=#d6d6d6
| 139986 ||  || — || September 16, 2001 || Socorro || LINEAR || KOR || align=right | 2.4 km || 
|-id=987 bgcolor=#d6d6d6
| 139987 ||  || — || September 16, 2001 || Socorro || LINEAR || fast? || align=right | 3.9 km || 
|-id=988 bgcolor=#d6d6d6
| 139988 ||  || — || September 16, 2001 || Socorro || LINEAR || BRA || align=right | 2.4 km || 
|-id=989 bgcolor=#d6d6d6
| 139989 ||  || — || September 16, 2001 || Socorro || LINEAR || — || align=right | 4.1 km || 
|-id=990 bgcolor=#E9E9E9
| 139990 ||  || — || September 16, 2001 || Socorro || LINEAR || — || align=right | 4.4 km || 
|-id=991 bgcolor=#d6d6d6
| 139991 ||  || — || September 16, 2001 || Socorro || LINEAR || — || align=right | 5.2 km || 
|-id=992 bgcolor=#d6d6d6
| 139992 ||  || — || September 16, 2001 || Socorro || LINEAR || — || align=right | 5.3 km || 
|-id=993 bgcolor=#E9E9E9
| 139993 ||  || — || September 16, 2001 || Socorro || LINEAR || — || align=right | 2.7 km || 
|-id=994 bgcolor=#d6d6d6
| 139994 ||  || — || September 16, 2001 || Socorro || LINEAR || — || align=right | 5.4 km || 
|-id=995 bgcolor=#d6d6d6
| 139995 ||  || — || September 16, 2001 || Socorro || LINEAR || — || align=right | 5.6 km || 
|-id=996 bgcolor=#E9E9E9
| 139996 ||  || — || September 16, 2001 || Socorro || LINEAR || — || align=right | 1.6 km || 
|-id=997 bgcolor=#E9E9E9
| 139997 ||  || — || September 16, 2001 || Socorro || LINEAR || AGN || align=right | 2.1 km || 
|-id=998 bgcolor=#d6d6d6
| 139998 ||  || — || September 16, 2001 || Socorro || LINEAR || — || align=right | 6.8 km || 
|-id=999 bgcolor=#d6d6d6
| 139999 ||  || — || September 16, 2001 || Socorro || LINEAR || KOR || align=right | 2.8 km || 
|-id=000 bgcolor=#d6d6d6
| 140000 ||  || — || September 16, 2001 || Socorro || LINEAR || — || align=right | 4.5 km || 
|}

References

External links 
 Discovery Circumstances: Numbered Minor Planets (135001)–(140000) (IAU Minor Planet Center)

0139